= NHIndustries NH90 =

Family of military helicopters

NH90
- A Finnish Army NH90 TTH

General information
- Type: Medium utility military helicopter
- National origin: Multinational
- Manufacturer: NHIndustries
- Status: In service
- Primary users: Italian Armed Forces Bundeswehr (Germany); French Armed Forces; Spanish Armed Forces
- Number built: 525 as of Jan. 2026

History
- Manufactured: 1995–present
- Introduction date: 2007
- First flight: 18 December 1995
- Variant: NHIndustries MRH-90 Taipan

The NHIndustries NH90 is a medium-sized European twin-engine multi-role military helicopter. It was the first production helicopter to feature entirely fly-by-wire flight controls. It makes extensive use of composite materials and electronic sensors. The helicopter has two primary models: the Tactical Transport Helicopter (TTH), oriented towards land applications (able to carry up to 20 troops); and the NATO Frigate Helicopter (NFH), oriented towards naval use in contexts such as anti-submarine warfare (ASW) and search and rescue (SAR) operations. Over 600 units have been produced for over a dozen NATO countries as of early 2026, and the model remains in production.

The NH90 was developed in response to North Atlantic Treaty Organization (NATO) requirements for a battlefield helicopter that would also be capable of operating in naval environments. It was developed and is manufactured by NHIndustries as of 2026. The first prototype conducted its maiden flight in December 1995, and entered operational service in 2007. As of June 2022, the NH90 has logged a combined 327,053 flight hours in the armed forces of thirteen countries.

Despite its advanced features, the program has faced significant criticism and early retirement from some operators, including Norway and Australia, due to chronic delays, maintenance problems, and low operational readiness. In 2022, Norway terminated its NH90 program while demanding a full refund. Australia withdrew the helicopter in 2023, ahead of its planned retirement date of 2037. Currently in the mid-2020s, a dozen countries continue to use the NH90, while additional orders and improvements equate to ongoing and widespread use. Efforts are ongoing to increase roles, implement upgrades, increase service life, and improve ease of maintenance.

== Development ==
=== Origins ===
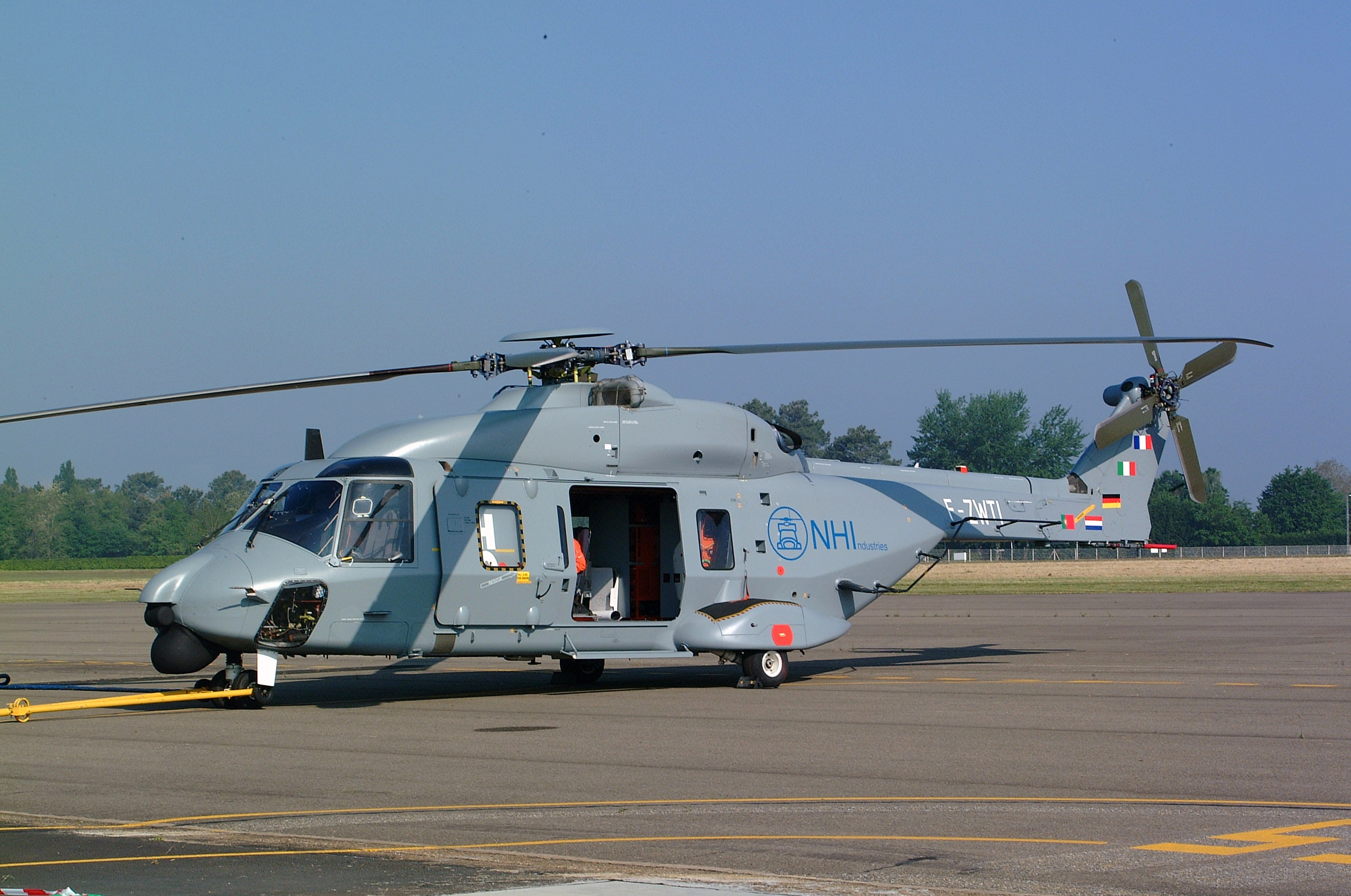
NH90 prototype in 2004

In 1985, France, West Germany, Italy, the Netherlands, and the United Kingdom collaborated to develop a NATO battlefield transport and anti-ship/anti-submarine helicopter for the 1990s. The United Kingdom left the team in 1987. On 1 September 1992, NHIndustries signed an NH90 design-and-development contract with NAHEMA (NATO Helicopter Management Agency). This agency represented the four participating states: France, Germany, Italy, and the Netherlands. Portugal later joined the agency in June 2001. Design work on the helicopter started in 1993. The first prototype, PT1, made the type's first flight on 18 December 1995. The second prototype, PT2, first flew on 19 March 1997 and the third prototype, PT3, on 27 November 1998. On 12 December 2002, PT3 became the first helicopter to fly exclusively with fly-by-wire controls after the removal of mechanical back-up controls.

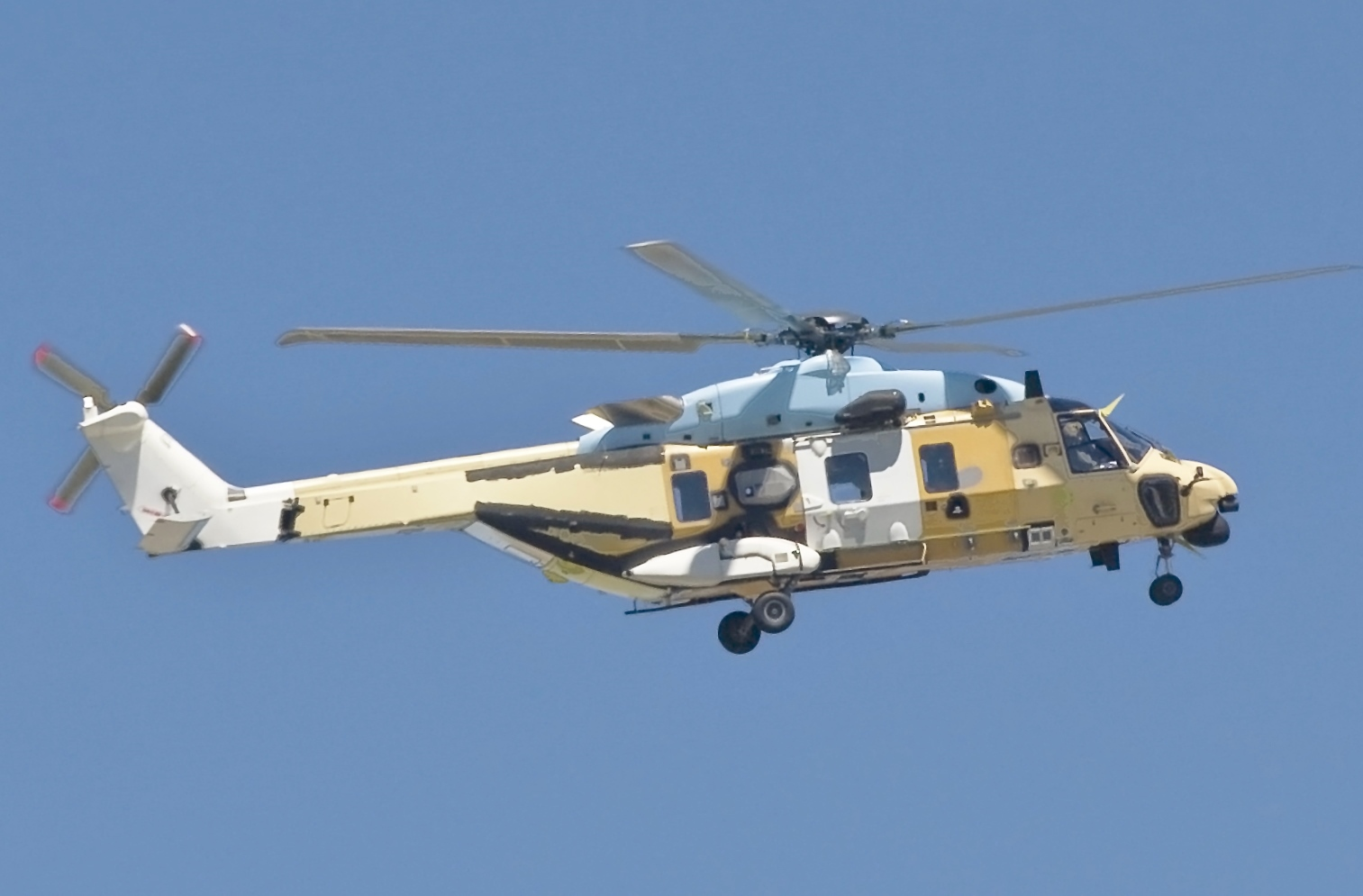
In progress NH90 production model over Brisbane, 2009

The NH90 was developed into two main variants: the Tactical Transport Helicopter (TTH) and the NATO Frigate Helicopter (NFH). These two main variants share about 75% commonality with each other. Many of the operators have requested specific configurations for their own helicopter fleets, thus each country's NH90 is effectively customized to the end-user's requirements. During the development phase of the program in the 1990s, both technical and funding problems were experienced. In June 2000, the partner states placed a large production order, worth US$8.6 billion, for a total of 366 helicopters. Additional orders have since followed from customers in Europe, Asia, and Australia. By April 2013, a total of 529 NH90s of all variants were on order by various customers. As of early 2023, there were 597 on order, and the 500th airframe was delivered at that time.

The NH90 was initially intended to be produced at three exporting final assembly lines (FAL): Cascina Costa in Italy for AgustaWestland, Marignane in France, and Donauwörth in Germany for Airbus Helicopters. The Nordic and Australian contracts stipulated production locally (the Nordic ones at Patria in Finland and the Australian ones in Brisbane). Spain has a final assembly line at Albacete. The Marignane assembly line can reportedly complete up to 22 NH90s per year.

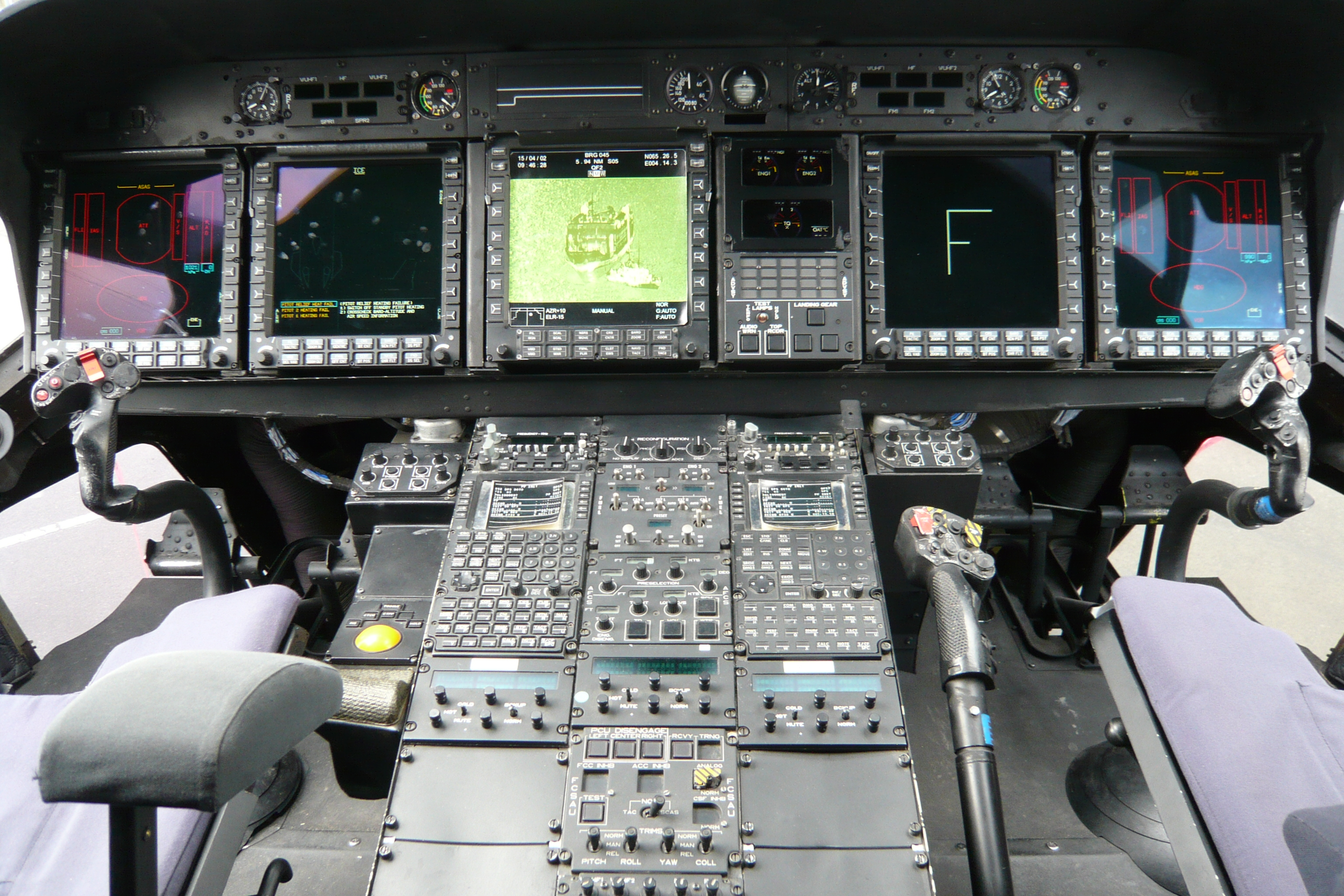
The glass cockpit of an NH90

Major components are produced by each of the shareholding companies:

- Airbus Helicopters France 31.25% (Engines, rotors, electrical systems, flight control, and the core avionics systems)
- Airbus Helicopters Deutschland 31.25% (Forward and center fuselage, fuel system, communications, and avionics control systems)
- GKN Fokker 5.5% (Tail structure, doors, sponsons, landing gear, and the intermediate gearbox)
- AgustaWestland 32% (Rear fuselage, main gearbox, hydraulic system, automatic flight control and plant management systems, power plant, and the NFH mission system)

Items built by the shareholding companies are then distributed to the six locations for assembly and flight test (Marignane, France; Tessera, Italy; Donauwörth, Germany; Halli, Finland; and Brisbane, Australia).

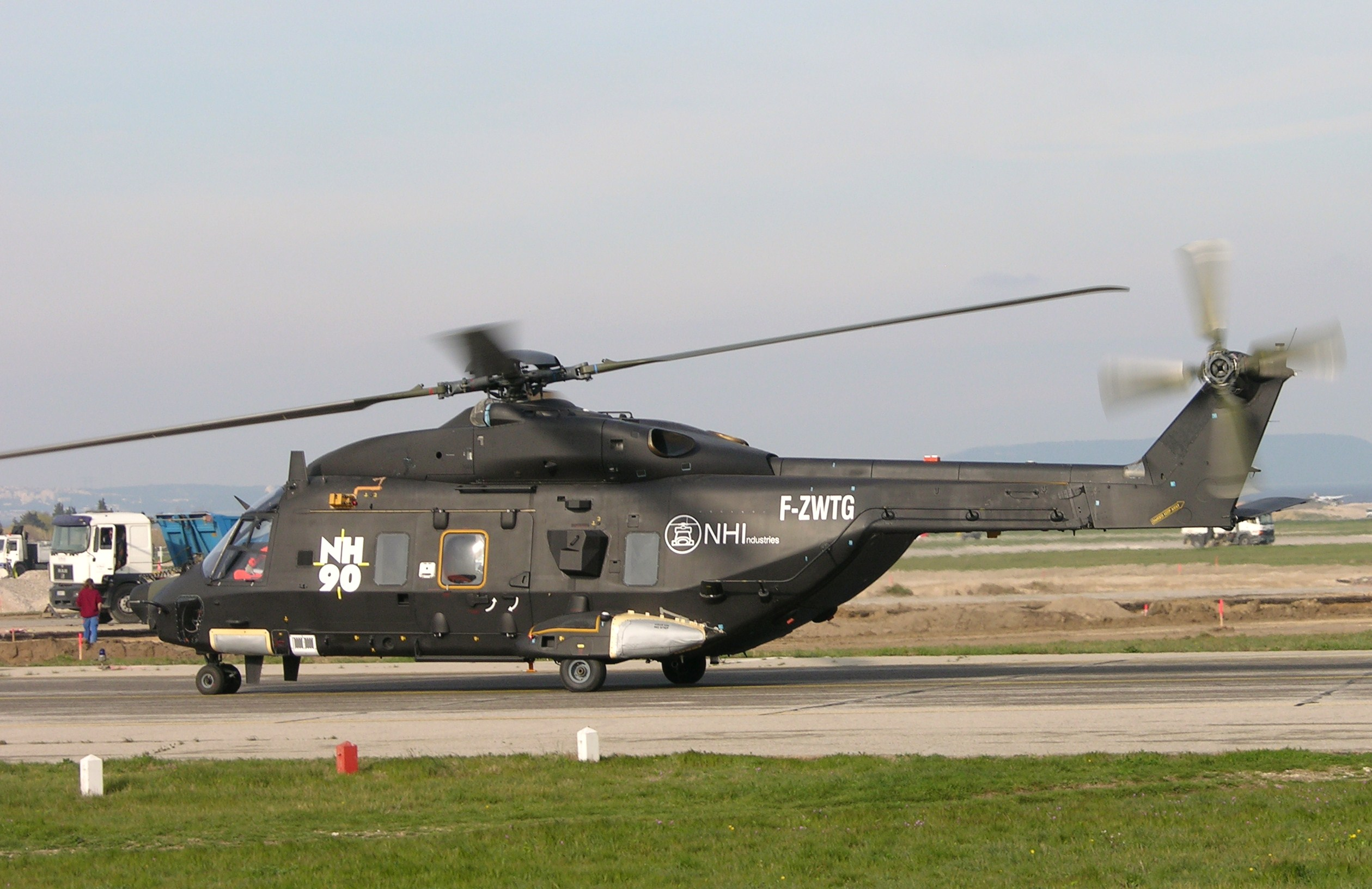
The first NH90 for Sweden rolls off of the assembly line, 2007

In late 2006, the German Army, the first customer to receive production aircraft, accepted delivery of its first NH90 TTH. In April 2010, the Royal Netherlands Navy was the first customer to receive the Navy's NH90 NFH variant. In June 2014, the consortium announced that it had completed delivery of the 200th NH90; at that point, the backlog of orders was reported as reaching out to 2020. To alleviate delays and reduce the complexity of manufacturing a large number of NH90 variants, NHIndustries (NHI) proposed the adoption of a simplified baseline airframe that could be configured to the individual customer's requirements. Between 2004 and 2016, the production lead times for the NH90 had reduced from 18 months to 7.5 months.

In 2014, production of the NH90 peaked at 53 helicopters built that year. In October 2015, the delivery of the 250th NH90 was formally accepted by the Italian Army. In 2015, the rate of NH90 production declined, reportedly due to countries choosing to delay their orders and some contracts having been fulfilled; in 2016, the Finnish final assembly line became the first to close with its orders completed. In 2023, the 500th NH90 was delivered to the French Army from the Marignane facility.

Although no US order has been taken, it has been noted that the NH90 could be produced at Airbus' facility in Mississippi, US. Although a civilian version has not been produced, the NH90 was designed from the start to potentially meet FAA certification requirements; it has been speculated that the high-cabin variant already in production would be typical of passenger rotorcraft. If produced, it would fit between the AS365 Dauphin and the AS322 Super Puma in Airbus' product line. NHI studied making a civilian version of the NH90 in 2004.

As of March 2024, 515 airframes had been delivered, including 24 different variants used by 14 countries.

=== Performance concerns ===
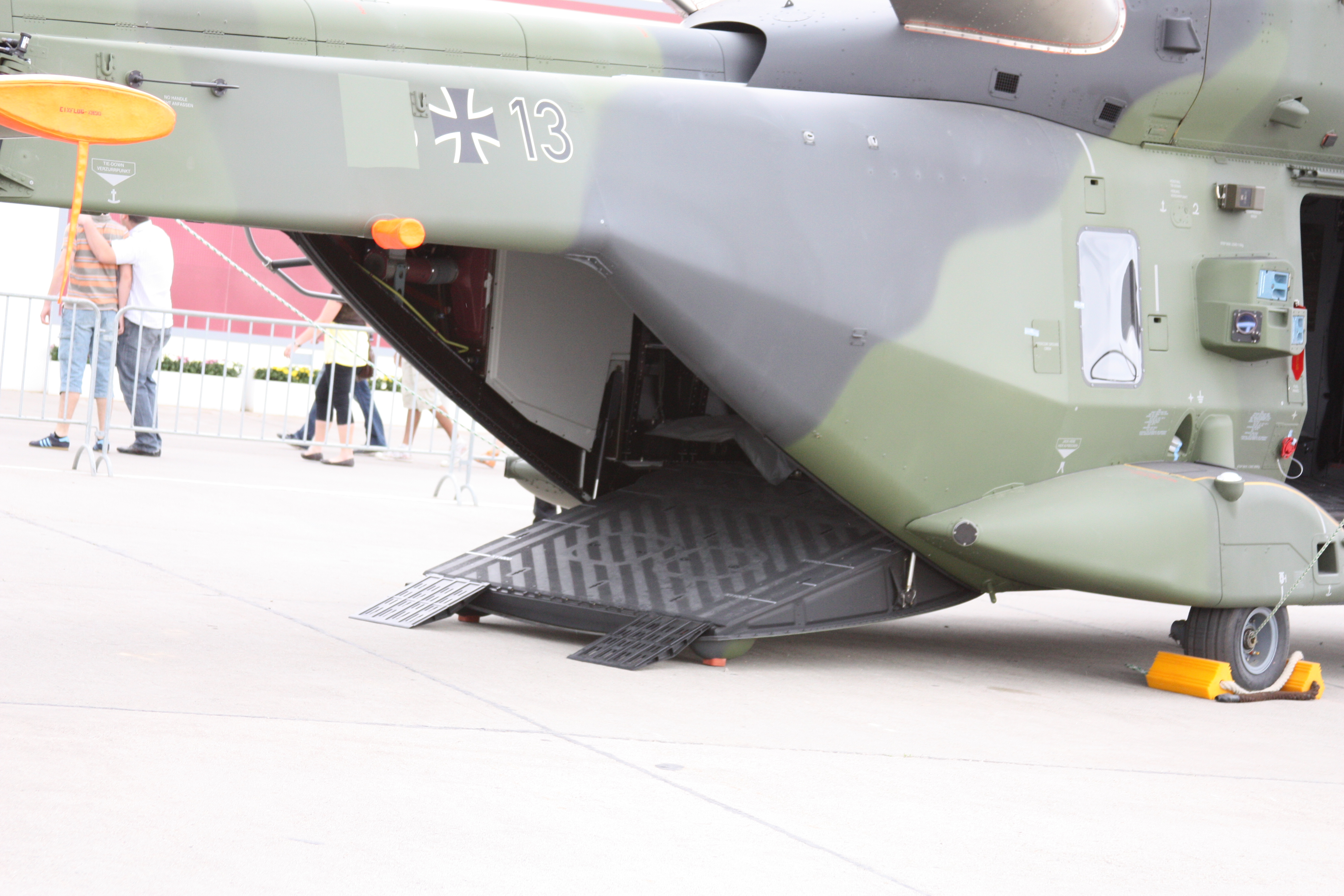
The lowered rear cargo ramp of a German Army NH90. The NH90 TTH can be produced with a rear ramp, one difference with the standard Frigate model.

In 2010, German tabloid Bild reported that German Army experts had concerns that the helicopter was not yet ready for the transportation of combat troops. They stated that the seats were rated for only 110 kg (240 lb), not considered enough for a fully equipped soldier. Heavy infantry weapons could not be adequately secured and the cabin floor was prone to damage, citing an anecdote of damage caused by footwear. The helicopter could only land on firm ground, with obstacles not exceeding 16 cm (6.3 in). Troops carrying full equipment could not use the rear ramp due to weight limitations placed on it. Adding a door machine gun was not possible due to space taken by troop ingress and egress; there was also no provision for fast roping or paratrooper equipment. In response, the German Defense Ministry proclaimed that this article referred to a prototype, not to the production model; the specifications for which were not even finalized at the time. The prototype evaluation and its results were described as a normal procedure in an ongoing design process.

In November 2011, the MRH-90 program was placed on the Australian Department of Defence's "Projects of Concern" list. The most serious problem identified by a diagnostic review, which caused a brief grounding in 2010, is compressor blade rubbing caused by the bending of a spool in the Rolls-Royce Turbomeca RTM322 engine due to uneven cooling after shutdown. Other problems identified include failure of transmission oil cooler fans, windscreen cracking, an inertial navigation system that is slow to align, and the weakness of the cabin floor to withstand the impact of soldiers' boots – a problem also encountered in German service.

In March 2014, it was announced that a Dutch NH90 had suffered higher than expected fuselage wear and corrosion following an extended deployment at sea. Analysis by the Dutch National Aerospace Laboratory attributed the corrosion to design and assembly flaws. However, the fleet was not grounded. In response, NHIndustries launched a corrosion prevention program and enacted several design modifications. In December 2014, the Dutch NH90 deliveries (which had been temporarily halted earlier in the year) restarted after the majority of identified points were addressed and an agreement was made by the manufacturer to bear the cost of developing modifications, repairs, and preventive measures against corrosion.

==== Operational costs ====
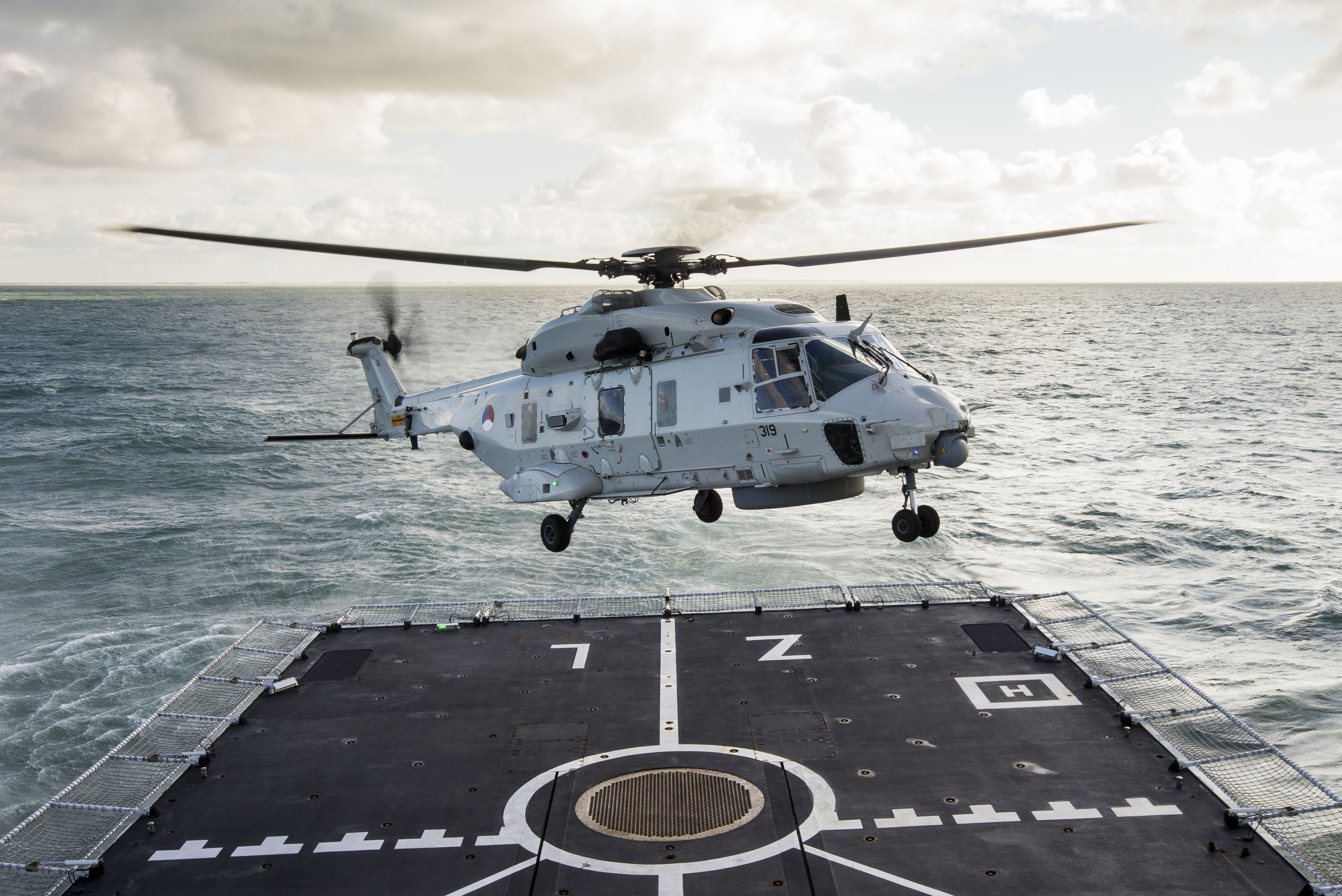
Dutch NH90 NFH coming in for a landing on HNLMS Zeeland in 2016

Ron Mark, New Zealand First Deputy Leader and Spokesperson for Ministry of Defence put out a press release in 2017 criticizing the high cost of NH90, citing the statistics of 2015: "The NH90s cost $1,182 an hour to fly and that is 2.5 times more expensive than the Iroquois they replaced. They're also unreliable, chewing through $3.3 million worth of spares in just two years."

The operating cost of an NH90 HCV (High Cabin Version) was reported in Swedish media during 2018 as at least 200,000 SEK (later specified as 242,000 SEK in the McKinley report, ordered by the Swedish Ministry of Defence) per hour flown, or about US$28,000. In contrast, the HPK 16, MH-60M Blackhawks in Swedish service had a cost of 40,000 SEK per hour. This difference sparked a heated debate not least since it was revealed that the defense minister had demanded that the purchase had to be a joint procurement with the other Nordic countries which in turn excluded all other contenders. (see Nordic Standard Helicopter Program) Debate among defense bloggers commenced when it was revealed that much of these costs was the result of the accounting practices forced upon the Swedish defense forces. The purchase cost and annual services had been factored in, meaning that the cost per hour increases the less flight time per year the fleet gets. In this debate, it was also pointed out that the Finnish defense had budgeted CPFH to €15,900 in 2017, which the year after had been lowered to €10,000.

In 2020, the Belgian Ministry of Defence announced a 40% cut to the NH90's annual flight time, stating that, while the Westland Sea Kings retired in 2019 had a cost per flight hour of around €5,000, the NH90 was more than double that at €12,000 per hour. Additionally, the reliability was impacted by a lack of service personnel to keep the fleet flightworthy.

The Australian Parliament released their report "MRH-90 Taipan helicopter: a quick guide" in 2021, detailing problems with the NH90 since 2005 and why they will be replaced. There, the CPFH is listed as "the helicopter's estimated operating costs were $30,000 to $40,000 per hour, which is 'higher than those combat aircraft with sophisticated weapons and sensor systems' (p. 72). More recently, the cost has increased to $50,000 per hour."

Axel Aloccio, head of NHI since mid-September 2022, believes that most problems stem from the teething issues of a new system that take a few years of service to find and correct, and that most are either solved or will be addressed with the transformation plan called "New Horizon" that Aloccio's predecessor, Nathalie Tarnaud Laude, launched. This program of system-wide changes had the aim of 50–60% average global fleet availability by the end of 2022 through better spare part availability and localization of overhaul services. It also seeks to lower operating costs. The time between maintenance inspections and overhaul for dynamic components have both been raised by 50% to keep them synchronized, from 600/1200 flight hours to 900/1800 hours, respectively. The Australian fleet is to be dismantled for spare parts, which it is hoped will increase the supply of spare parts for other users.

NHIndustries is in the process of extending the service life of the NH90 airframe from 30 to 50 years, or roughly 20,000 flight hours.

== Design ==
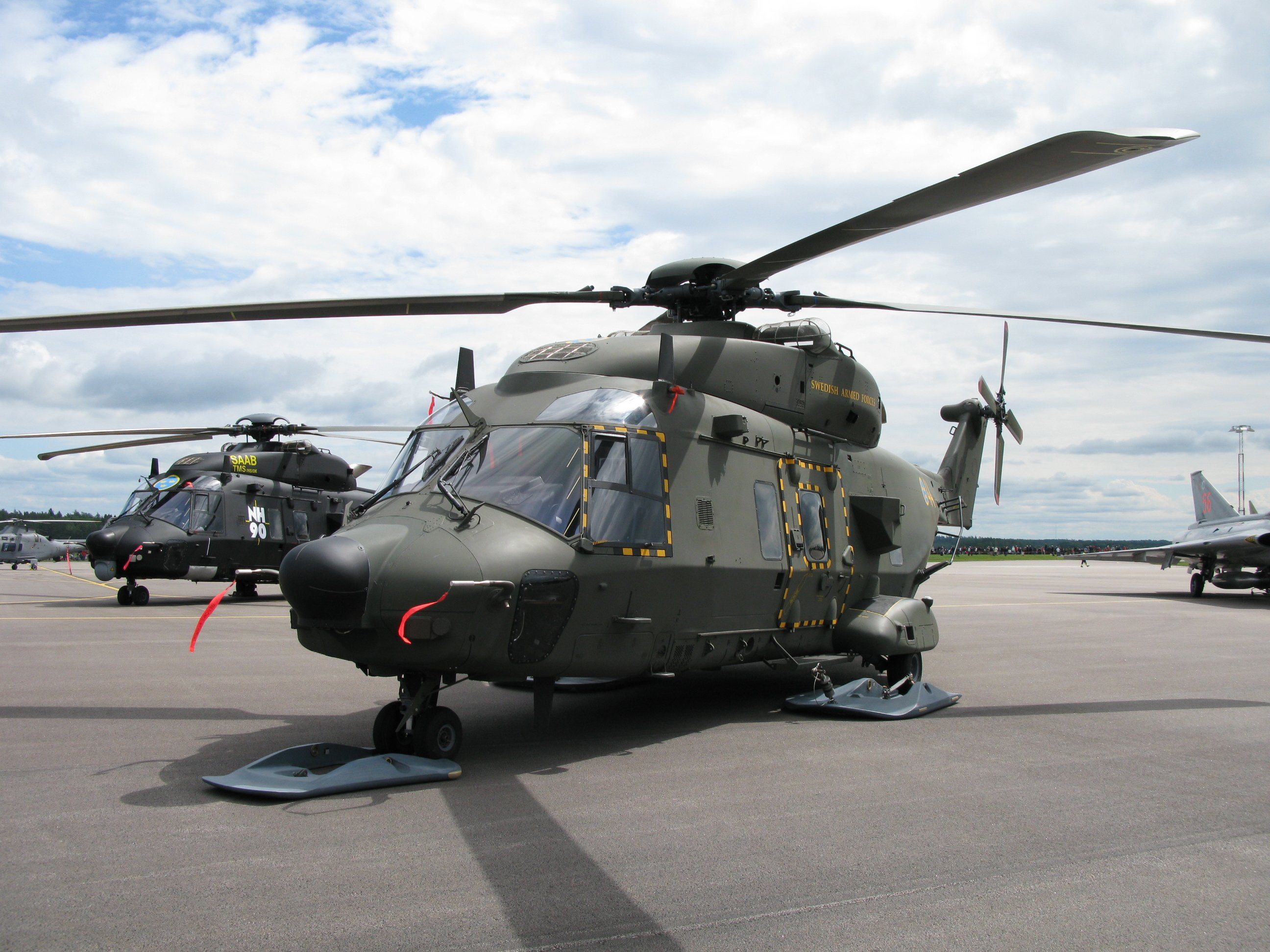
Swedish Army HCV version, with a higher cabin height

The NH90 was designed to fulfill a NATO staff requirement for a multirole, medium-sized military helicopter for both land and maritime operations. According to Flight International, the NH90 is the first helicopter in the world to be developed in line with NATO requirements. As such, the design of the NH90 conforms with multiple national and international standards, including military airworthiness processes in Germany, France, Italy, and the Netherlands; conformance with FAR 29 and MIL-STDS design standards, as well as DEF-STN 00-970 icing conditions performance and electromagnetic compatibility. It is produced in two principal variants, the battlefield Tactical Transport Helicopter (TTH) and the maritime NATO Frigate Helicopter (NFH).

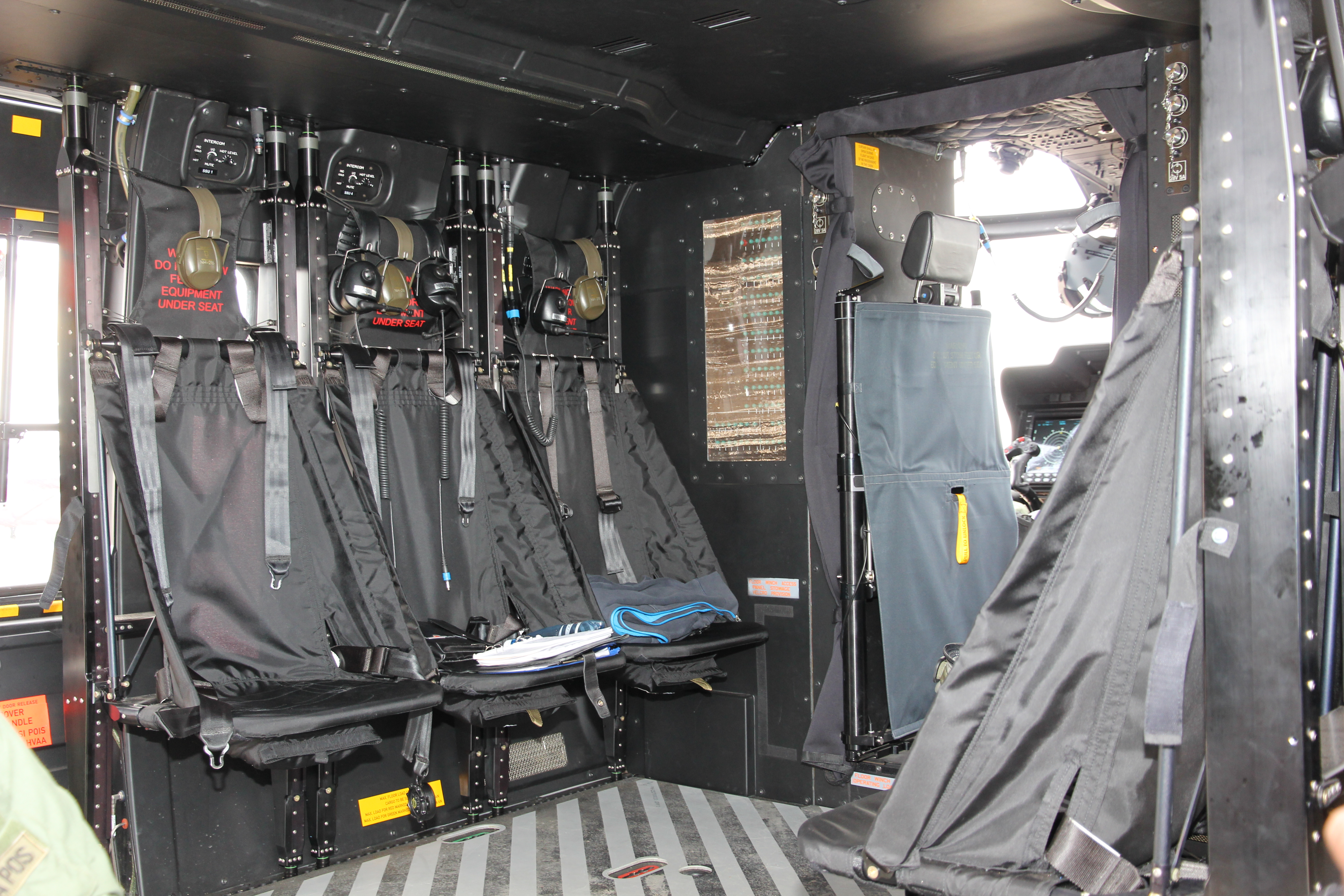
NH90 interior seating (Finnish TTH)

One key innovation of the rotorcraft is the four-channel fly-by-wire control system employed; the NH90 is the first helicopter in the world to be equipped with full fly-by-wire flight controls. A four-axis autopilot is also integrated with the fly-by-wire system, as are mission and navigation systems, to enable greater autonomy during operations and reduce pilot workload. The flight envelope of the NH90 is capable of all-weather day-and-night operations, ship-borne operations during high sea states, across a temperature range from −40 °C to +50 °C, and up to a maximum altitude of 20,000 feet. Power is provided by a pair of turboshaft engines, dependent on customer selection, the NH90 is either fitted with Rolls-Royce Turbomeca RTM322 or General Electric CT7-8F power-plants; exhaust gases from the engines are filtered through an infrared suppression system for decreased sensory visibility. The NH90 has three gearboxes including the Main Gearbox (MGB), Intermediate Gearbox (IGB), and a Tail Rotor Gearbox (TGB).

According to Airbus Helicopters, the NH90 possesses the lowest radar signature in its class, principally due to its diamond-shaped composite fuselage.

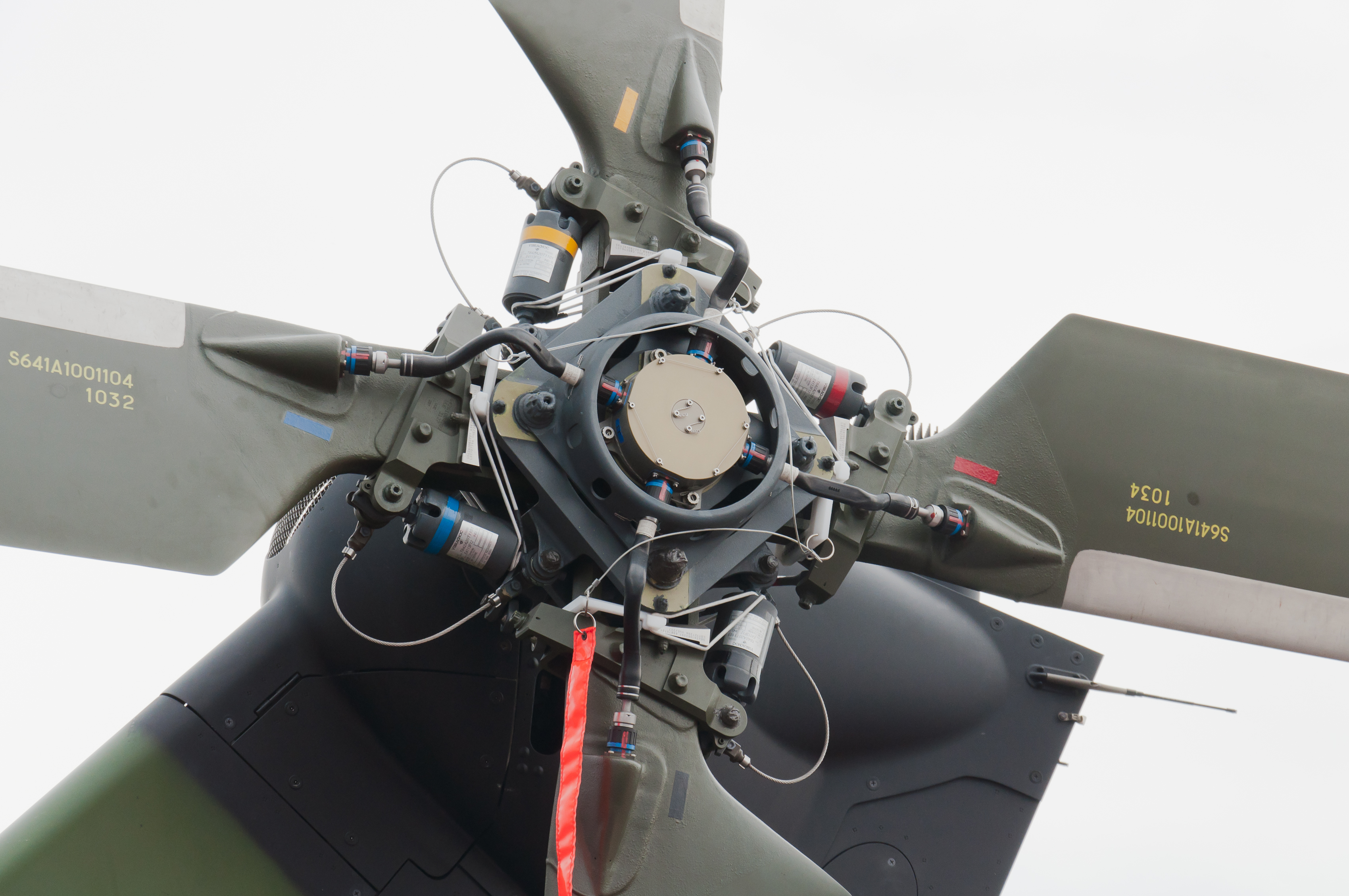
NH90 tail rotor

The NH90 features an advanced composite airframe, designed for ballistic tolerance, a high level of crashworthiness, lower weight, and 30 percent greater endurance than a metallic counterpart. The four main rotor blades are also composed of composite materials, increasing fatigue strength and lifespan while providing greater damage tolerance. The unobstructed main cabin area is entered either by large sliding doors on either side of the fuselage or via a rear ramp. The cabin is designed to accommodate modular equipment packages to enable the rotorcraft to be rapidly reconfigured, providing for operational flexibility. In a troop-transport capacity, the cabin can accommodate up to 20 fully equipped soldiers, or up to 12 stretchers in a medical evacuation role, some light vehicles may also be transported; the main cabin is equipped with environmental control systems and sound proofing measures to improve passenger conditions.

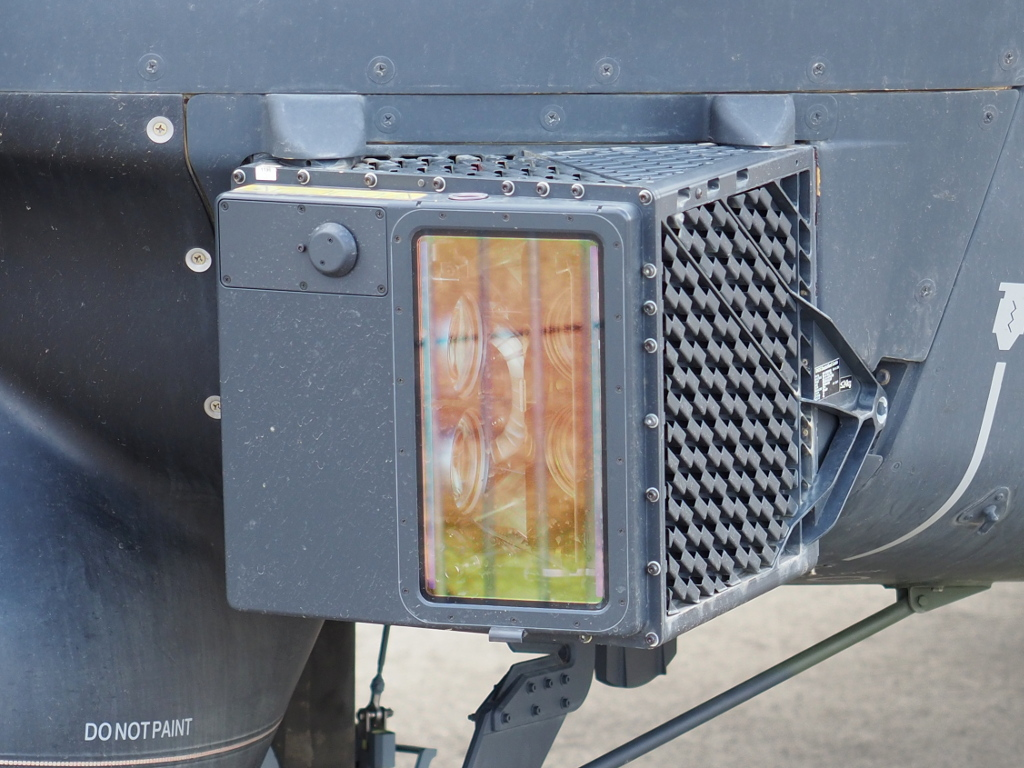
HENSOLDT SferiSense 500

The NH90 can be equipped with various mission-specific systems, including modular armour plating around the cabin area for undertaking high-risk missions and an ice protection system for operations within cold climates. It can also make use of the Helicopter In-Flight Refuelling System (HIFR) as well as additional internal and external fuel tanks to conduct extended range missions. Other equipment includes a wire strike protection system, rappelling system, hoist, cargo hook, search light and various seating options, including crashworthy foldable seats. For performing maritime operations, such tasked NH90s are typically equipped with the Harpoon deck-locking system, automatic main rotor blade and tail folding mechanisms, and other deck handling systems to conduct all-weather ship-borne operations; it is also typically outfitted with dipping sonar and sonobuoy processing equipment. The NH90 is equipped with emergency floats, which deploy in case of a water landing and are designed to give personnel enough time to exit the helicopter before it sinks.

The NH90 features a range of customizable avionics systems, dependent on customer selection and purpose. On some models, French firm Thales Group provides various parts of the avionics, such as the glass cockpit, full-colour multifunction displays, tactical mission and encrypted communication systems, the TopOwl helmet-mounted sight/display, IFF and autonomous navigation systems, and the electrical power generation system. Other systems include a forward looking infrared (FLIR), weather radar, digital map generation system, enhanced ground proximity warning system, personal locator system, and VHF/UHF/HF tactical radios. In 2015, the NH90 became the first helicopter to receive a laser-based airborne collision avoidance system. Onboard mission systems feature a dual-redundant database, are compliant with MIL-STD-1553, and are comprehensively managed via sensor fusion functionality. Customer demand for future avionics improvements such as new data links and communication systems, as well as additional electro-optical sensors, has been anticipated by the manufacturer.

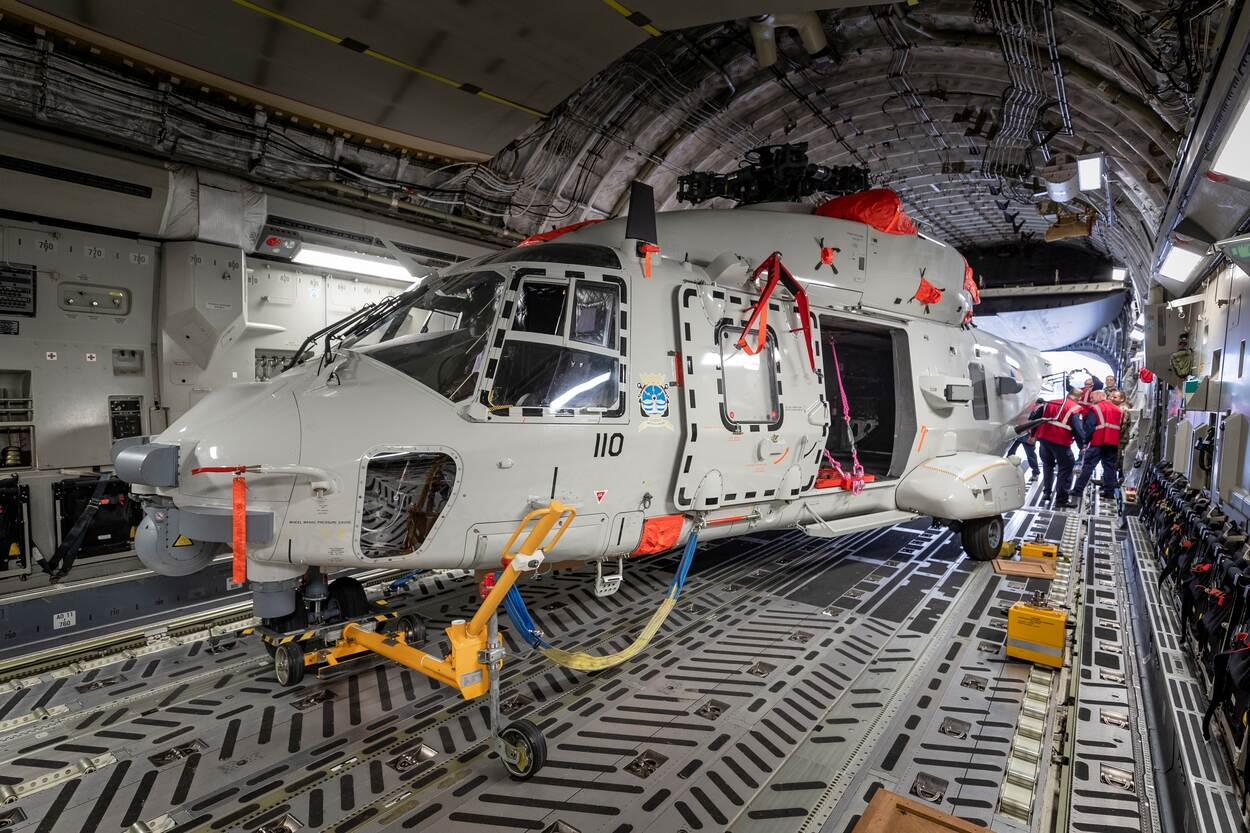
NH90 armed variant inside a C-17 for transport, 2020

NHI's long-term plan for the NH90 had reportedly included service life extensions, avionics upgrades, and possibly adding heavier armament for the army versions, such as rockets or guided missiles. In 2020, an upgraded TFRA2 Special Operations version was announced, featuring numerous specialized modifications on the TTH, including extra fuel tanks, twin gun mounts, fast roping from the removable rear door, Helmet Mounted Sight Digital Display, and various enhanced or extra visual sensors with displays for increased situational awareness.

In June 2024, plans were announced for the Block 1 upgrade, which was also called software release 3 (SWR3); called a "roadmap milestone", this involves an upgrade to NH90 software, weapons systems, and capabilities. Standard 3 configuration of an NH90 includes stronger landing gear, automatic folding main rotor, maximum take-off weight of 11 tonnes, enhanced communication and safety features. The first Standard 3 configuration NH90 helicopters were delivered in December 2024.

== Operational history ==
=== Australia ===
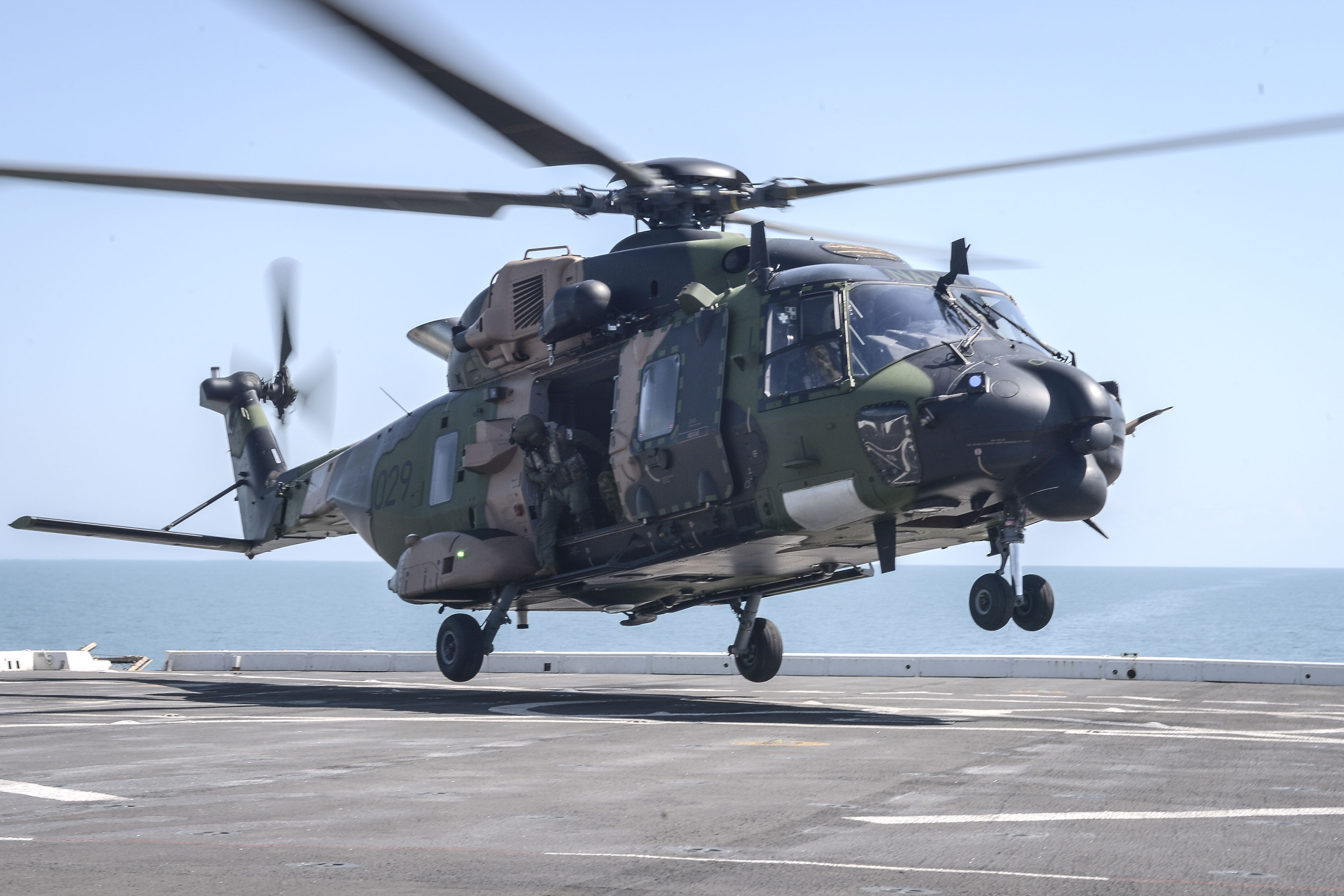
A Royal Australian Navy MRH-90 in 2015

Australia ordered the NH90 in 2004 to replace its S-70A Black Hawk helicopters, eventually acquiring 46 aircraft designated MRH-90 Taipan, most of which were assembled domestically. The type entered service in 2007 with the Australian Army and later with the Royal Australian Navy. The program was affected by technical issues, delays and increased costs, prompting repeated groundings and extending the service life of older helicopters. After multiple operational challenges and two serious accidents in 2023, the fleet was permanently withdrawn from Australian Defence Force service in September 2023, ahead of its planned retirement, and replaced by the UH-60M Black Hawk.

=== Belgium ===
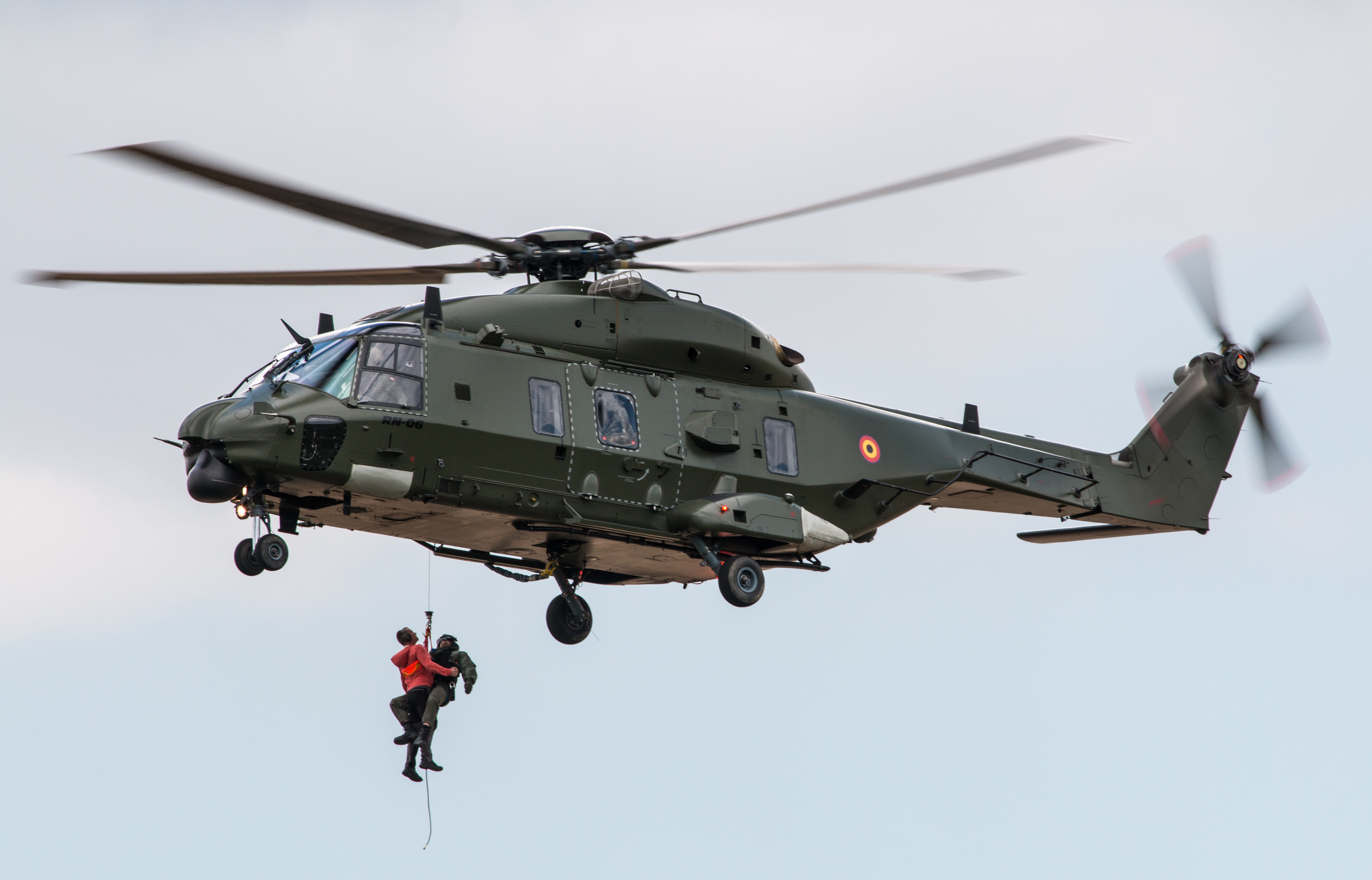
Belgian NH90 with two people on the winch, 2015

In 2007, Belgium signed on for a firm order of 8 aircraft (4 TTH, 4 NFH) and an option for 2 additional TTH. In September 2012, NHI performed the first flight of Belgium's TTH, which is broadly similar to the French NH90 "Caiman" version. In January 2013, eight NH90s were on firm order. On 1 August 2013, Belgium received its first NH90 NFH at full operational capability. On 23 October 2013, Belgium's first NH90 TTH entered service, and the last was delivered on 13 November 2014. From first delivery until the last, three NH90s flew 34 hours a month for a total of 450 flight hours with a 67 percent availability rate, making Belgium one of the type's most intensive users. Two NH90 NFHs for the navy were delivered. The final two were delivered by early 2015 to replace their Westland Sea King helicopters for search and rescue operations.

On 21 August 2015, the Belgian Navy declared its NH90s had attained initial operational readiness. On 28 August 2015, the first rescue mission performed by a Belgian Navy NH90 took place.

In June 2020, the Strategic Defence Review (STAR) of Belgium planned to phase out the 4 TTH helicopters by 2024 due to their high operating costs and low availability. They are planned to be replaced, along with the Agusta A109, by 15 Airbus H145M helicopters. The 4 NFH variants are to remain operational and be provided with currently-lacking sensors and weapons for anti-submarine warfare (ASW). There was discussion in 2023 to sell the 4 TTH and buy one more NFH; together with the acquisition of new helicopters the NFH will no longer be tasked with search and rescue missions. Belgium is expanding its defence budget and naval capabilities in the 2030s, and naval NH90s are planned to be upgraded and to operate from in-service frigates. In addition, Belgium is using NH90 mission flight trainer in partnership with the Netherlands.

In July 2025, the decision was made to phase out 4 NH90 TTH as per the September 2025 announcement by the Belgian Minister of Defence due to the high costs associated with the helicopter and the lower than expected availability.

=== Finland ===
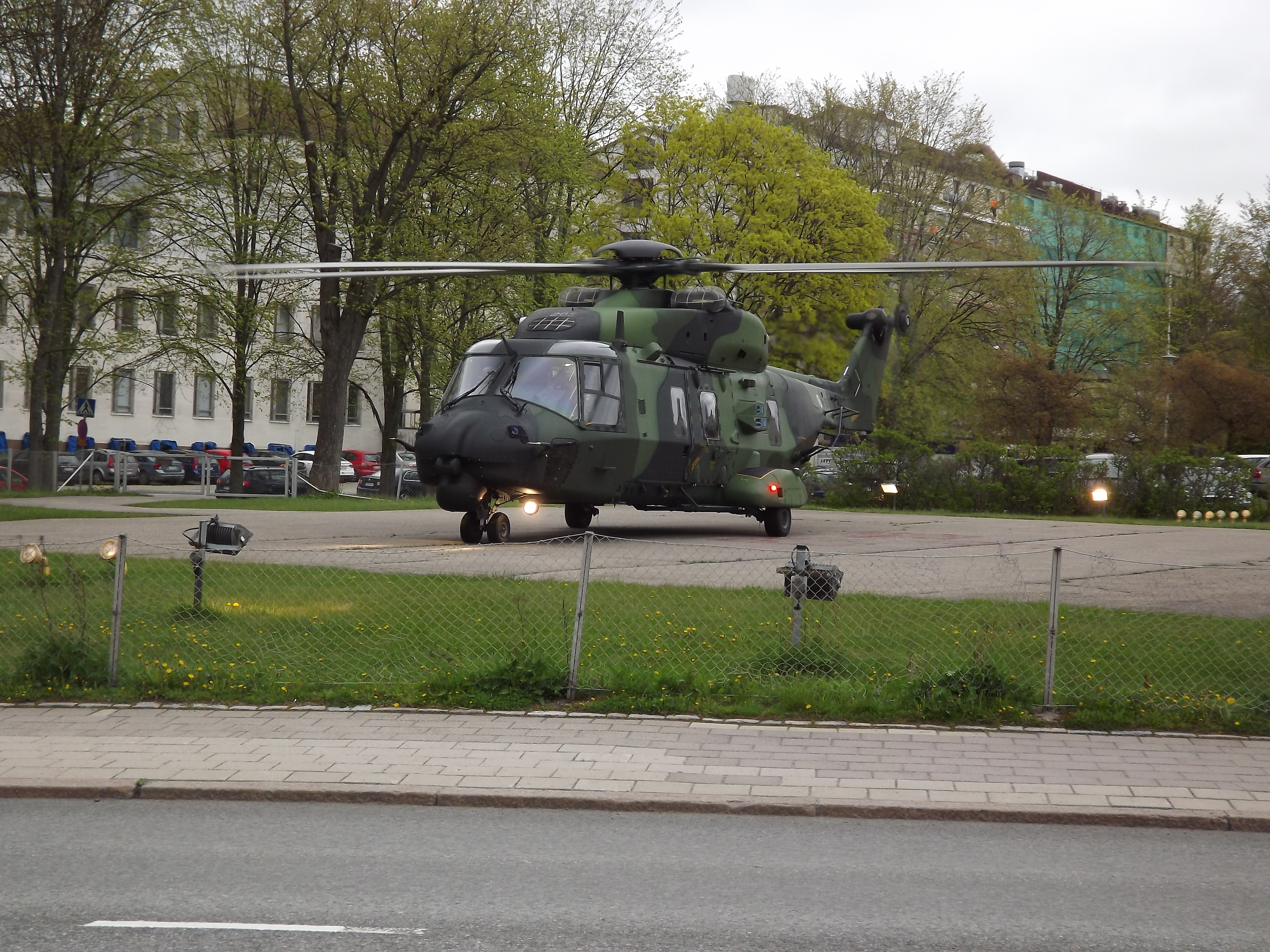
Finnish Defence Forces NH90 in Turku, Finland in May 2012

In October 2001, Finland signed a contract for 20 NH90 TTHs for the Finnish Army to replace its ageing fleet of Mil Mi-8 helicopters. This decision was made as a group as part of the Nordic Standard Helicopter program along with Sweden and Norway. In March 2008, NHIndustries began NH90 deliveries to Finland; deliveries had been delayed from an initial 2004 date, to minimize further delay, aircraft were first delivered to an Initial Operational Configuration (IOC-) and Nearly Operational Configuration (IOC+), to be later modified by Patria into a Final Operational Configuration (FOC). In September 2011, the Finnish Defence Forces and Patria signed an agreement to provide ballistic protection for onboard personnel across the NH90 fleet.

In June 2011, nine Finnish NH90s participated in the Finnish Defence Forces' main field exercise, transporting 157 soldiers across 320 kilometres in two rotations; their performance was described as having exceeded expectations. In January 2015, it was reported that Finnish NH90s had been experiencing considerable reliability issues, at one time in 2014 fleet availability dipped to 19%, and some spare parts had up to seven months waiting time. By early 2015, the combined NH90s fleet had accumulated a total of 7,000 flight hours, and had an availability rate of 40%. On 18 June 2015, delivery of the final Finnish NH90 took place. In November 2015, the availability rate was reported as having surpassed 50 percent. All were in Final Operational Configuration (FOC) in 2018.

=== France ===
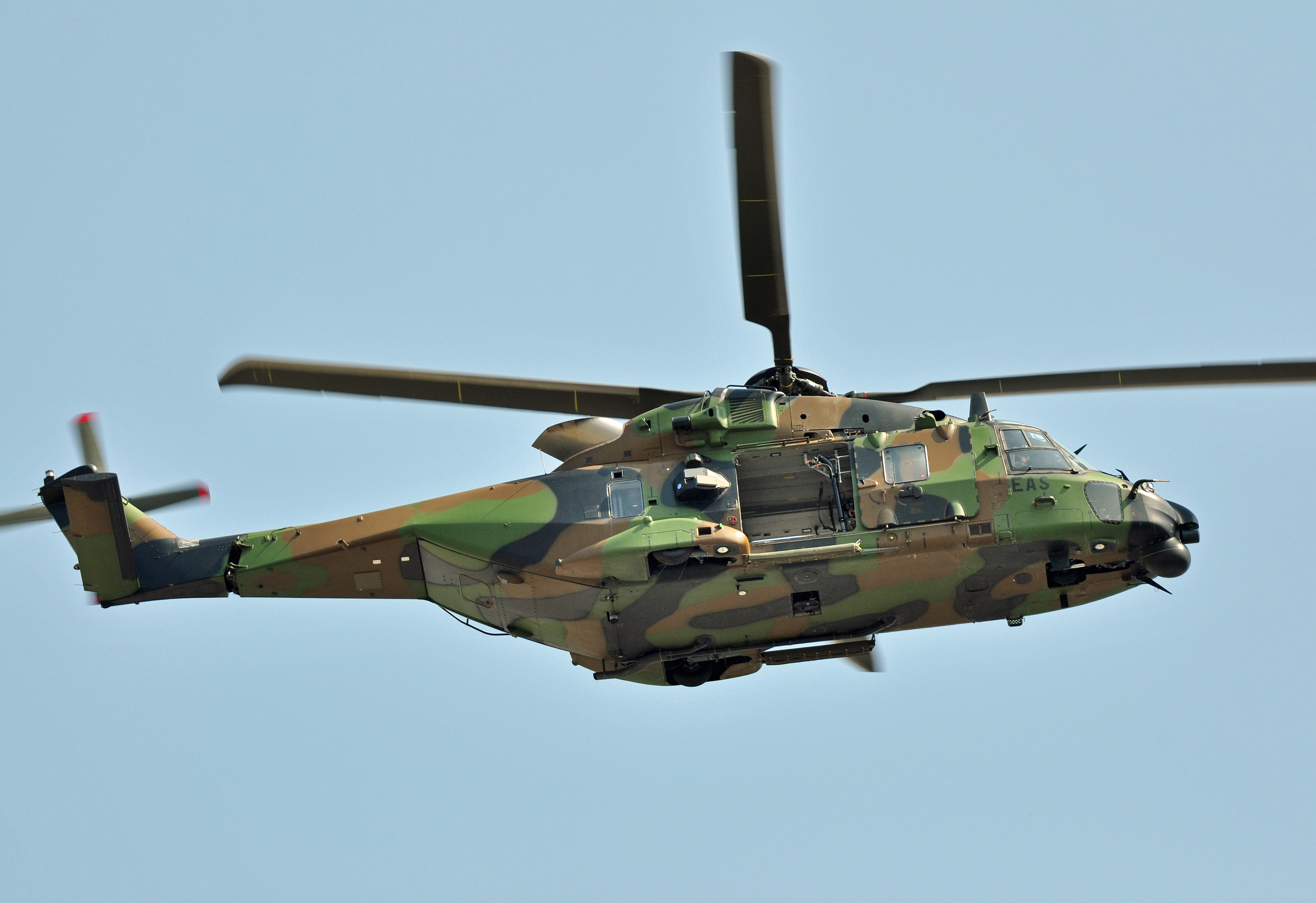
French Army NH90, 2014

The French government had initially ordered a total of 34 NH90 TTHs for the French Army Light Aviation and 27 NFH for the Navy. Both versions will be named "Caïman" and final assembly will be carried out by Airbus Helicopters. Early on, the French Army stated its intention to buy 68 NH90 in two separate contracts. Under the "Bonn rebate" deal, France received a 12% discount on its 68 Army NH90s; a November 2012 Senate report put the French TTH unit price at €28.6M after discount, set on the assumption of total orders of 605 aircraft by 2020. Cuts to France's order would have led to workshare reallocation; possibly including French Navy NFH90s being assembled in Italy and Fokker performing maintenance of French TTHs. On 29 May 2013, France formally ordered the second batch of 34 NH90 TTHs for just under €1 billion. In January 2016, France placed an order for six additional NH90 TTHs.

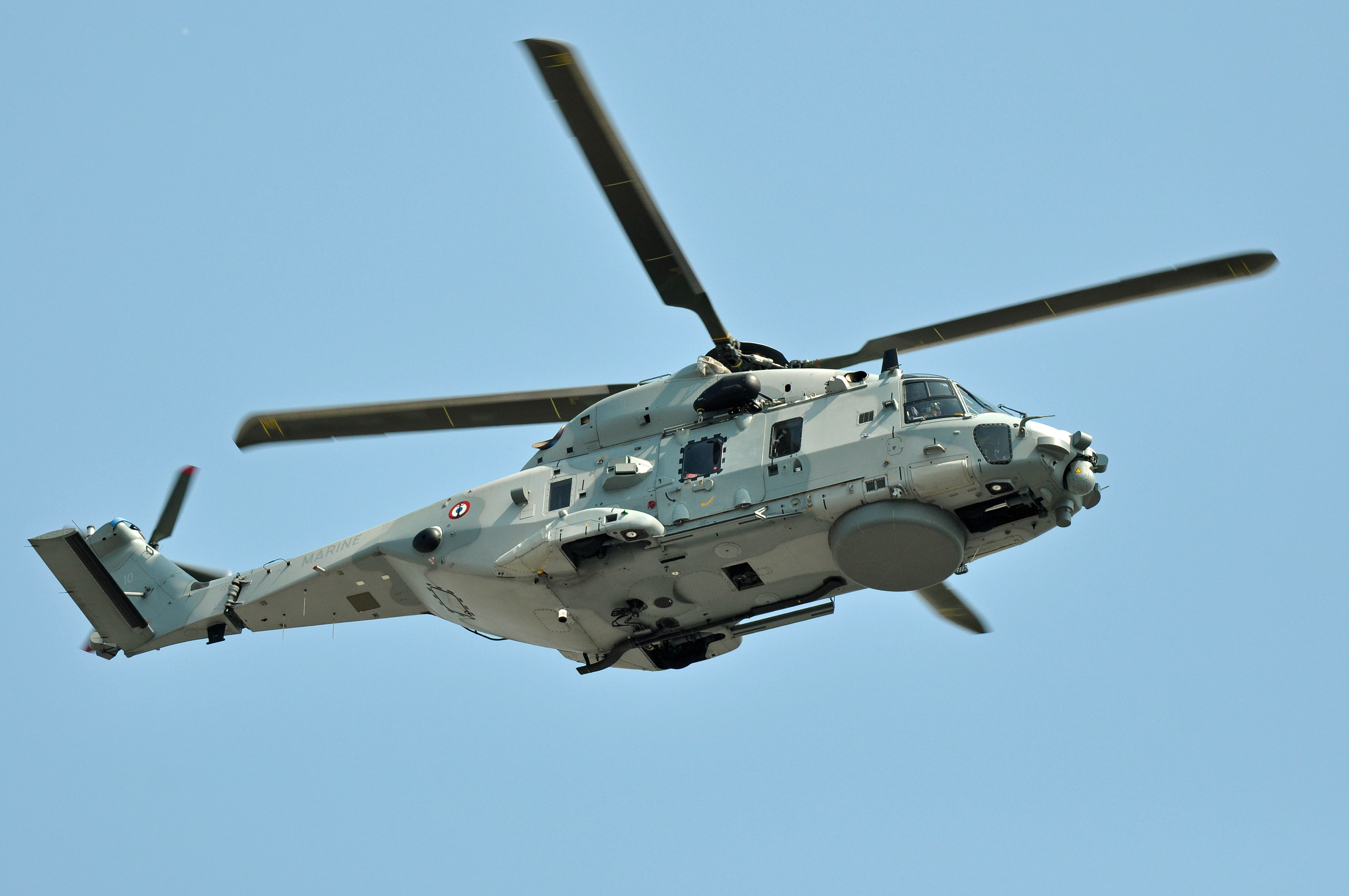
French NFH (naval version), 2018

The French Army took delivery of its first NH90 TTH in December 2011. Just one week after entering service, a French NH90 rescued 19 people from supply ship TK Bremen at night. On 21 December 2012, the French Navy received its first NH90 NFH in final operating capability. In December 2010, the NH90 formally achieved in-service status with the French Navy, being initially used to perform search and rescue and maritime counter-terrorism operations. The first seven NH90s were delivered to an interim "Step A" configuration; later deliveries were to the "Step B" standard and produced at a rate of two per year until 2020. For the ASW role in French service, it is equipped with dipping sonar, acoustic buoys and MU90 torpedoes. The French Navy formally cleared the type to perform ASW duties in 2012, clearance to perform ASW missions followed in 2013, allowing the NH90 to take over missions previously performed by the Westland Lynx and Aérospatiale Super Frelon rotorcraft fleets. On 3 November 2014, the French Army Light Aviation deployed two of its NH90s to Mali; both helicopters had been fitted with three additional fuel tanks to fly the four-day ferry flight to the region.

In October 2020, France signed a contract to develop the TFRA Standard 2 configuration for the French Army's special forces using the final batch of 10 NH90 TTH already ordered. A design study for the new configuration began 18 months earlier in cooperation with Belgium and Australia. The first phase featured a Safran EuroFLIR 410 electro-optical system (EOS), external 500 kg (1,100 lb) fuel tanks and a digital 3D map. The cabin was outfitted with a central rappelling and extraction device, gun mounts for M3M.50 caliber machine guns and foldable step. The rear ramp has a quick removable leaf doors system, fast-rope beam, foldable step, and various improvements made to enable the door's use mid-flight. Future gear, such as the Safran Eurofl'Eye distributed aperture system (DAS) and Thales TopOwl helmet-mounted display, may be integrated in a second phase with electrical and mechanical provisions made for their installation. The first five are to be delivered in 2025 and the last five in 2026 to the 4th Special Forces Helicopter Regiment.

In 2021, French NH90s rescued six people (and one stranded rescuer) from a capsized yacht in an offshore civilian sea rescue, in extreme sea and wind conditions at the edge of its flight envelope. The weather was so extreme the first rescuer was stranded when the winch line snapped, but the rescuer along with the boaters, who were in a life raft were able to be retrieved by an additional NH90. At the end of 2022, the French Navy finally retired its last Alouette III helicopters which had been in service for 60 years, and were the training helicopters before pilots moved onto the NH90, along with Dauphin.

=== Germany ===
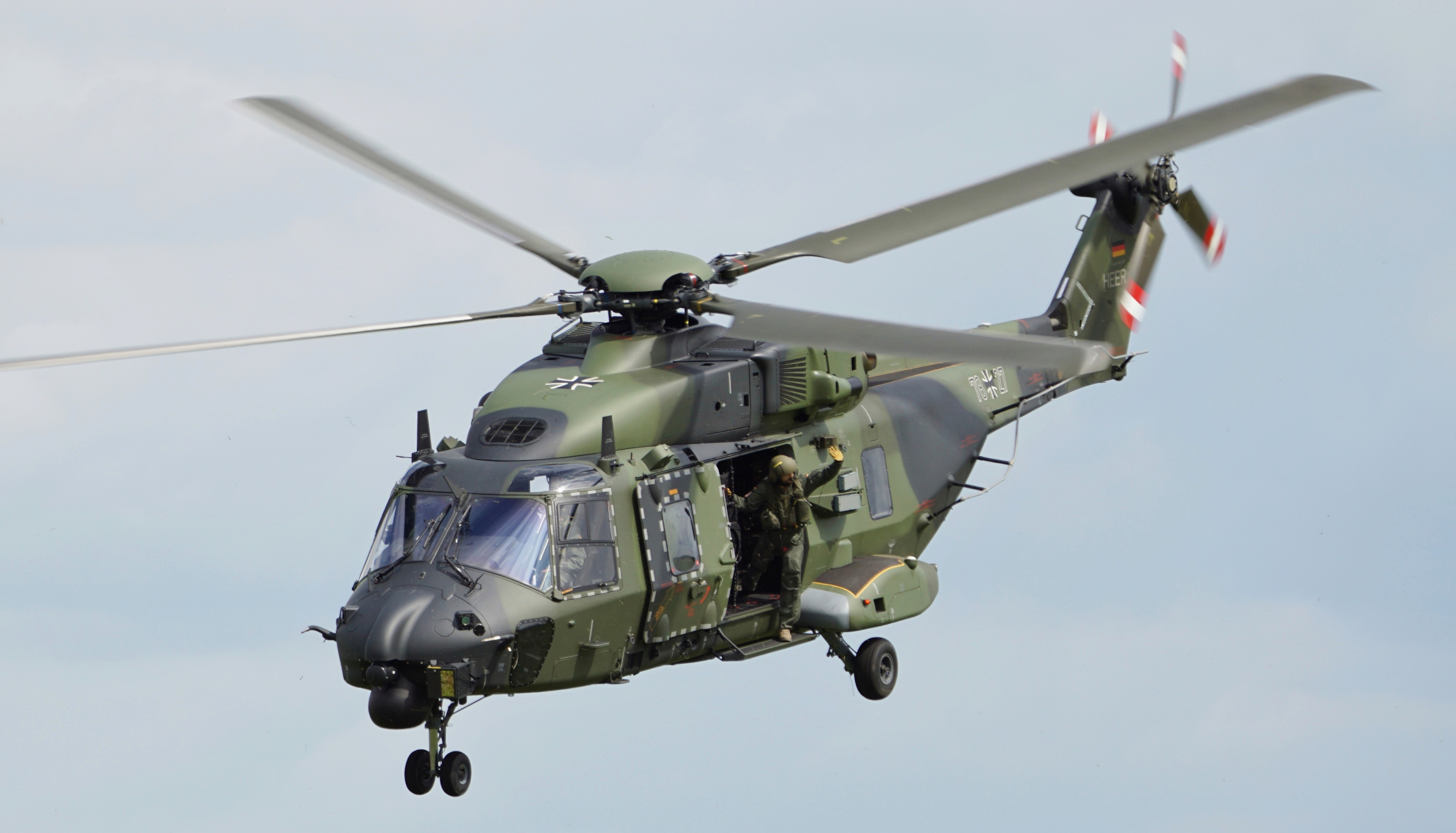
German Army NH90 at the ILA Berlin Air Show 2016

The German Army procured the troop transport variant; the first three serial production NH90s were delivered to the army in December 2006. By January 2013, a total of 80 aircraft were on order for the army. In 2009, the German Navy was also considering the procurement of up to 30 NFH for its new Maritime Helicopter. In March 2013, the German government chose to reorganize the NH90 procurement; the Army's fleet of 122 NH90s was reduced to 82; 18 NH90s previously ordered for the army were converted to the NFH maritime variant for the navy instead. On 26 June 2013, the German defense committee declared that the order for a combined 202 NH90 and Tiger helicopters was to be reduced to 157. In December 2014, Germany announced that, in addition to the 80 troop transports firmly on order, it was considering an option for an additional 22 NH90s; it was investigating the possibility of setting up a multinational helicopter unit to operate these 22 NH90s as a shared NATO resource with other countries using and contributing to the force.

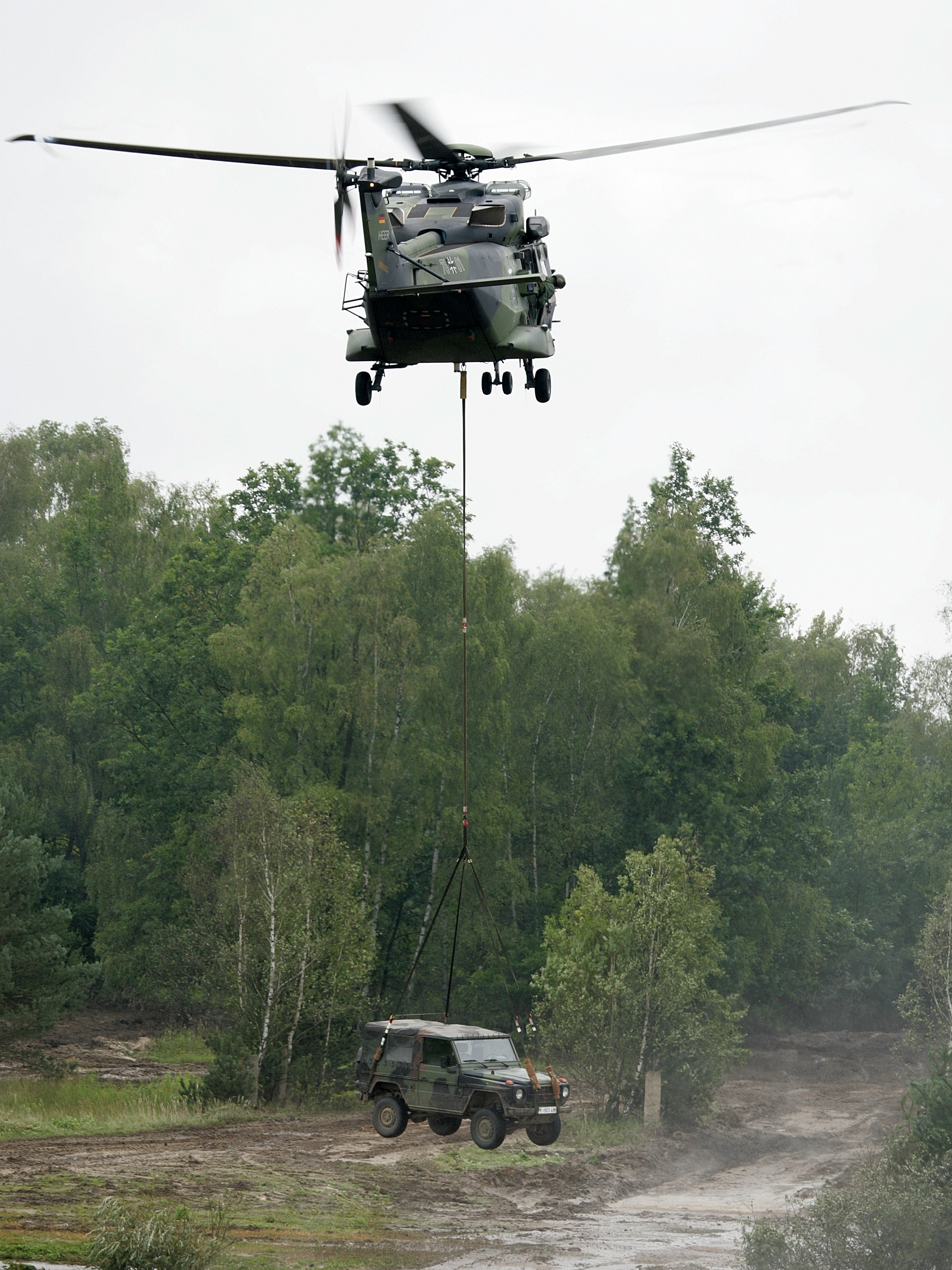
German Army NH90 lifts Wolf vehicle

In July 2012, Germany's NH90 fleet reached a combined total of 5,000 flight hours. In April 2013, up to 4 German Army NH90 TTHs were deployed in Afghanistan in a Forward Air Medical Evacuation role in support of coalition forces operating in the country. On 23 June 2013, German Army NH90s were declared operationally capable of medical evacuation operations. Following an engine failure and controlled crash in Uzbekistan in July 2014, the army temporarily grounded the type for investigation. In December 2015, it was announced that production of the German Navy's variant of the NH90 NFH, named Sea Lion, had commenced; a refit of the German Army's TTH variant was also underway at the same time. Since late 2014, Germany has promoted the creation of a multinational NH90 force for combat MEDEVAC missions; the taskforce would comprise up to 20 NH90s.

The Navy's version, known as the NH90 Sea Lion, is based on the NH90 NFH. It first flew on 8 December 2016. The 18 NH90 Sea Lions are equipped with improved navigation and communications equipment, permitting operation within civil airspace, along with additional sensors for military missions. The IFF system was also updated. Designed to replace Germany's Westland Sea Kings in the SAR and Vertrep roles, the Sea Lion was to enter service with the German Navy by the second quarter of 2019. The first NFH Sea Lion was accepted in October 2019. On 26 November 2019, the German Navy stated that the NH90 was not operational yet due to deficiencies in technical documentation not allowing safe operations. The NFH Sea Lion entered service in June 2020. By February 2023, 18 Sea Lions had been delivered.

On 20 November 2020, the Bundestag approved the purchase of 31 more helicopters for the navy to replace their 22 Sea Lynx Mk88A helicopters via a deal valued at €2.7 billion, including spares, accessories, and training material. This version, called the Sea Tiger, is designed for ASW and ship warfare (and can also do SAR), and operates in conjunction with German Navy Frigates. The Sea Tiger variant is similar to the French NFH Caiman version, it is planned to enter service starting in 2025. The first flight of the Sea Tiger was in late November 2023.

=== Greece ===
In August 2003, Greece ordered 20 NH90s with an option for 14 more. In early 2013, the German newspaper Bild alleged that Airbus officials paid €41 million in bribes to Greek officials to secure the order; Airbus stated that the claim was "groundless". On 12 December it was stated that deliveries would start again after an embargo by the Hellenic Government, with four helicopters being of the SPECOPS specification.

By early 2017, 12 NH90s had been delivered and were in service, with eight aircraft yet to be delivered. By December 2023, there were 16 NH90 in service, which operated alongside around twelve AS332 Super Puma and 60 older UH-1H (AB-205) as multirole helicopters; at this time it was announced the UH-60 was selected to replace both these older types. All 20 were delivered by October 2025. The follow-on support contract was signed in December 2025.

=== Italy ===
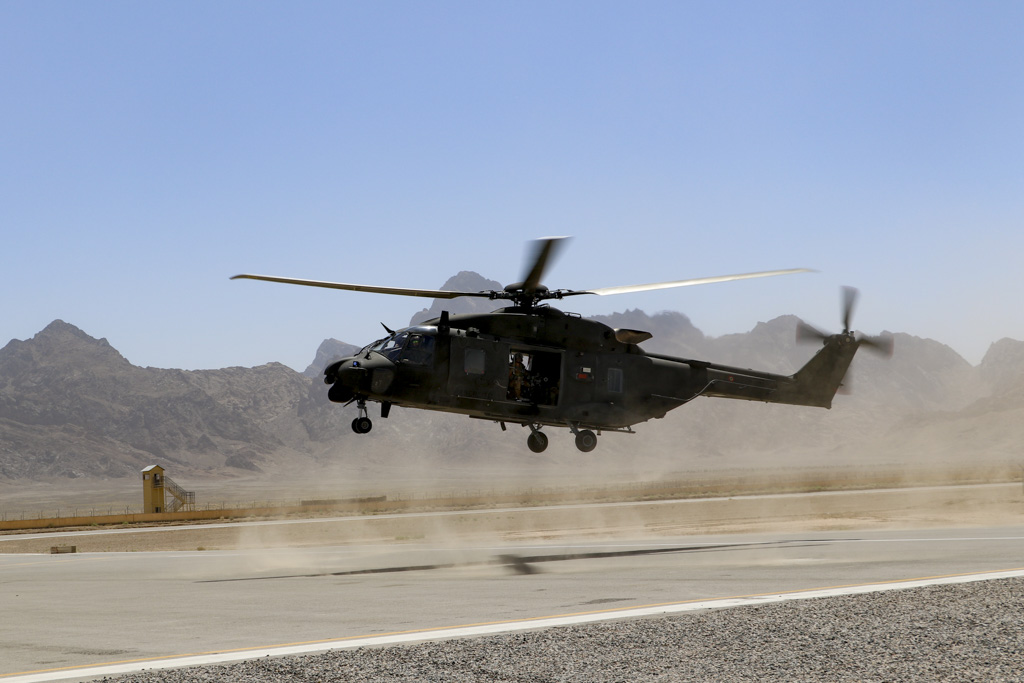
An Italian Army NH90 landing at Farah Air Base, Afghanistan, 2019

In June 2000, Italy signed an initial contract for a batch of 60 TTH (Tactical Transport Helicopter) for the Italian Army, along with a further 46 NFH (NATO Frigate Helicopter) and 10 TTH for the Italian Navy. On 30 December 2007, the first NH90 TTH was formally handed over to the Italian Army. On 23 June 2011, the navy received its first NH90, which was delivered to an interim MOC (Meaningful Operational Capability) standard, capable of performing training, search and rescue, and utility operations; anti-submarine and anti-surface warfare capabilities were not initially available until aircraft are retrofitted to a FOC (Final Operational Capability) standard. In May 2013, the Italian Army took delivery of the first NH90 TTH of a FOC standard; in November 2013, the Italian Navy took delivery of its first FOC-standard NH90 NFH. The Italian NH90 fleet uses the GE T700-T6E1 turbine engine. Italian NH90s are used for the following tasks tactical troop transport according NHI as reported by Heli Hub news: logistics support, special operations, cargo resupply and hoisting, medical evacuations, light vehicle transport, disaster relief, and emergency response operations.

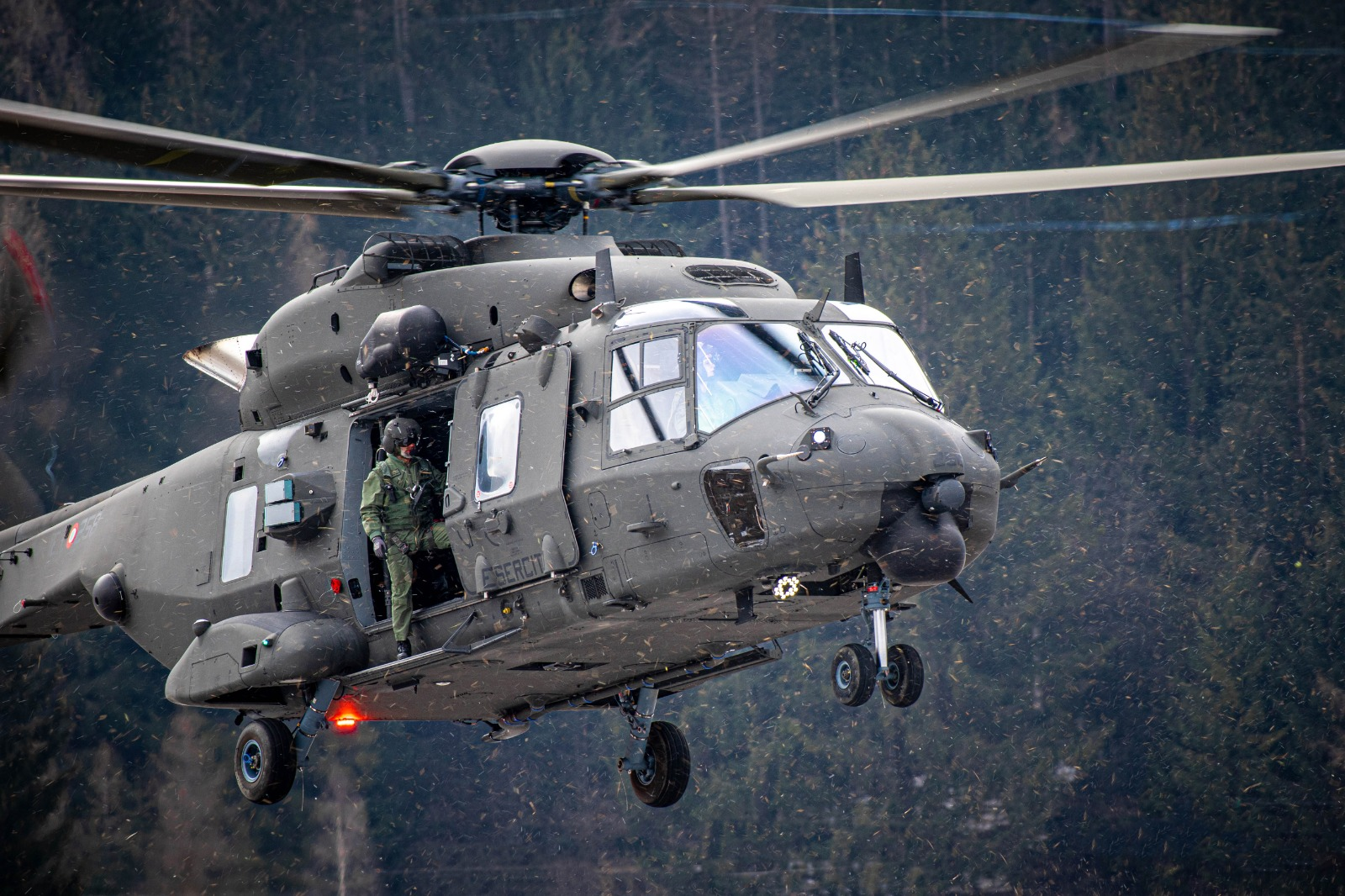
Italian NH90 in 2023

In 2012, Italy deployed a total of 5 Army NH90 TTHs to support troops participating in the International Security Assistance Force in Afghanistan. The NH90s, which were air-transported individually by allied Boeing C-17 Globemaster III cargo aircraft, replaced six Agusta/Bell 205s in performing tactical transport and medevac operations; Army Aviation Commander Gen. Enzo Stefanini stated that "...in Afghan conditions, the NH90 is delivering performance 15 percent above what was envisaged". In December 2022, Italy received its 60th and final TTH (Transport version) from the Venice Tessera facility which opened in 2010 and delivered its first aircraft in 2011.

In October 2023, the Italian Navy received its 56th and final NH90; that same month, the service also reportedly attained a cumulative 35,000 flight hours across its fleet.

=== Netherlands ===
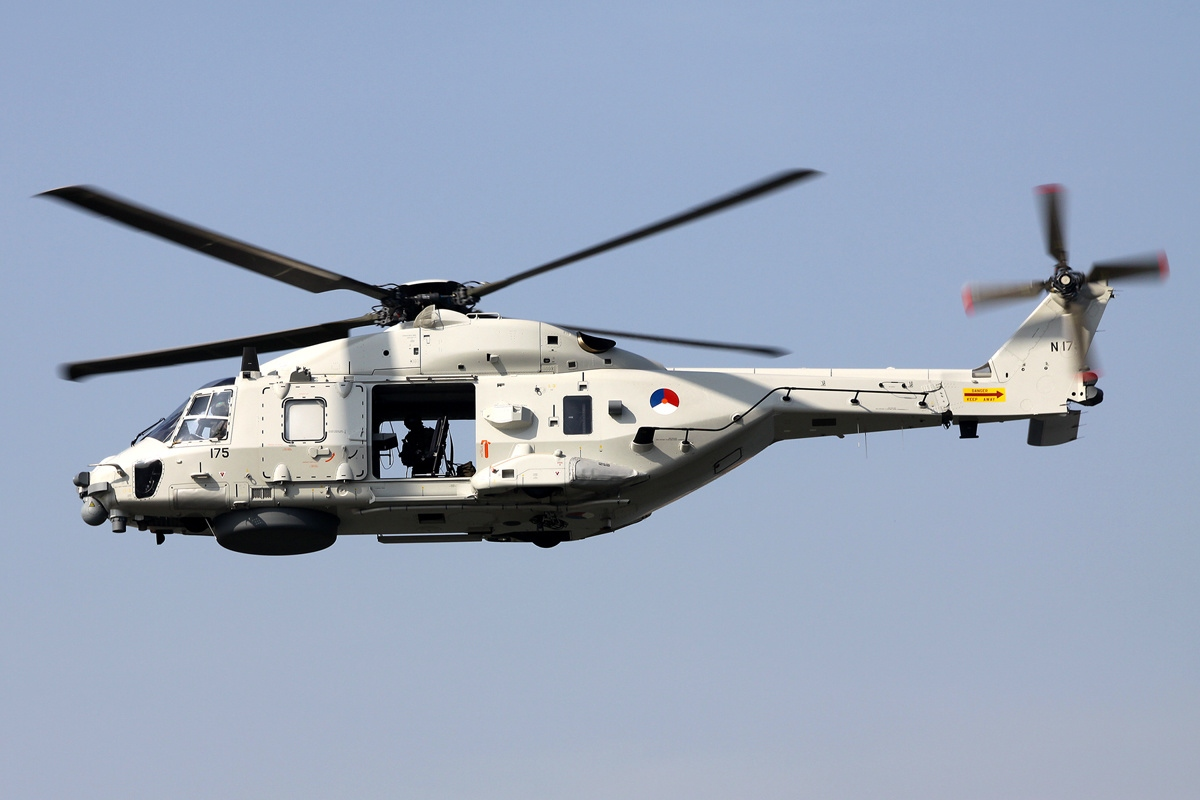
A NH90 NFH from the Royal Netherlands Navy

The Netherlands, one of the original supporters of the program, ordered a total of 20 units, comprising 12 NFH and 8 TNFH for the Royal Netherlands Navy, They replace the Westland Lynx. In 2010, the Royal Netherlands Navy became the first customer to receive the NFH variant.

In 2009, concerns surfaced that design changes had made the NH90 too heavy to operate from Dutch frigates for which they were ordered. In June 2014, the Dutch government decided not to accept the last batch of 7 NH90s due to some 100 shortcomings found in relation to the design, manufacture, and material choice of the rotorcraft, in particular corrosion in the presence of salt water. In December 2014, deliveries restarted after the Dutch government came to an agreement with NHI, under which modifications and necessary repairs against corrosion would be made at the manufacturer's cost; 75 of the 100 shortcomings were also reported as having been solved.

In April 2013, the navy deployed the type onboard HNLMS De Ruyter to fight piracy in the Gulf of Aden. In November 2014, the navy deployed a single NH90 NFH to Somalia to support Operation Atlanta. In 2020 one NH90 was lost in an accident in the Caribbean, which reduced the fleet size to 19. In 2024, the Netherlands announced it would upgrade its remaining fleet with a mid-life upgrade including communications and weapon systems.

On 5 September 2024, the Dutch MoD released the 2024 Defense Memorandum where 6 more NH90 NFH helicopters are to be ordered increasing the fleet to a total of 25. In the end, only 3 additional were ordered in December 2025. However, the contract includes an option for two more helicopters.

=== New Zealand ===
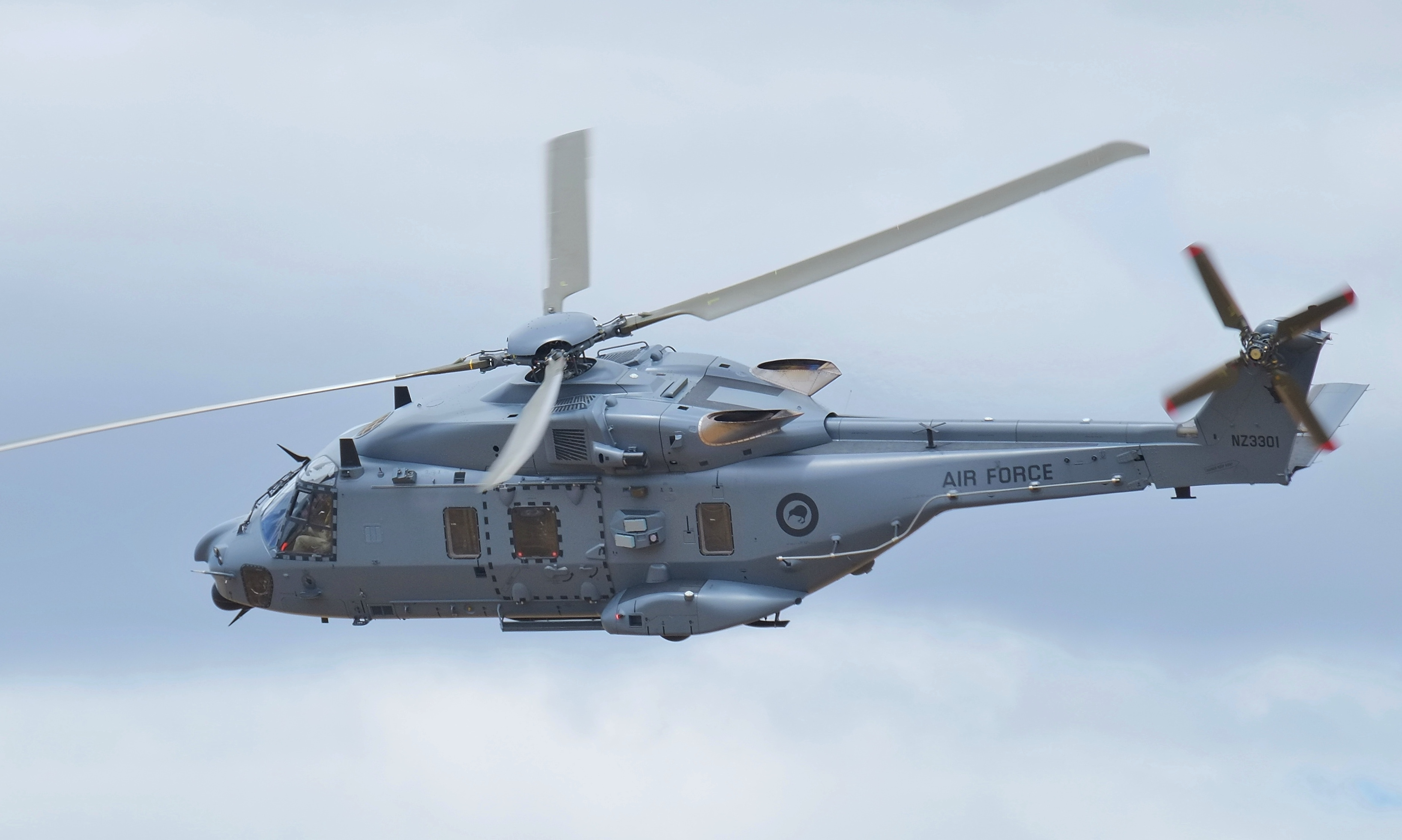
A RNZAF NH90 in a tight turn

In July 2006, the New Zealand government signed a NZ$771 million (~€500M) contract to purchase eight NH90s (plus one extra for spares) to replace the Royal New Zealand Air Force's (RNZAF) fleet of 13 UH-1 Iroquois helicopters. For ease of manufacture and logistics, New Zealand deliberately chose its NH90 configuration to be nearly identical to the larger Australian fleet. On 7 December 2011, deliveries to New Zealand formally began with the first two NH90s being airlifted by a leased Antonov An-124 cargo aircraft to RNZAF Base Ohakea. In February 2013, the first phase of the RNZAF's operational evaluation of the NH90 was completed, clearing the type to begin operational duties.

Between September 2013 and July 2014, the first four delivered NH90s were retrofitted to a final operational configuration; later aircraft were already delivered to this standard. On 31 October 2014, the RNZAF announced that they had received into service the last of the eight NH90 TTHs. Following command structure changes in December 2014, the NH90 fleet was tasked with additional responsibilities, including casualty evacuation during search and rescue operations and providing transport services to the New Zealand Police and other government personnel. In April 2015, Defence Minister Gerry Brownlee questioned the inability of the NH90 fleet to contribute to relief efforts in the aftermath of Cyclone Pam, revealing that the fleet may be refitted with an automated blade and tail folding system to better enable ship borne deployments in the future.

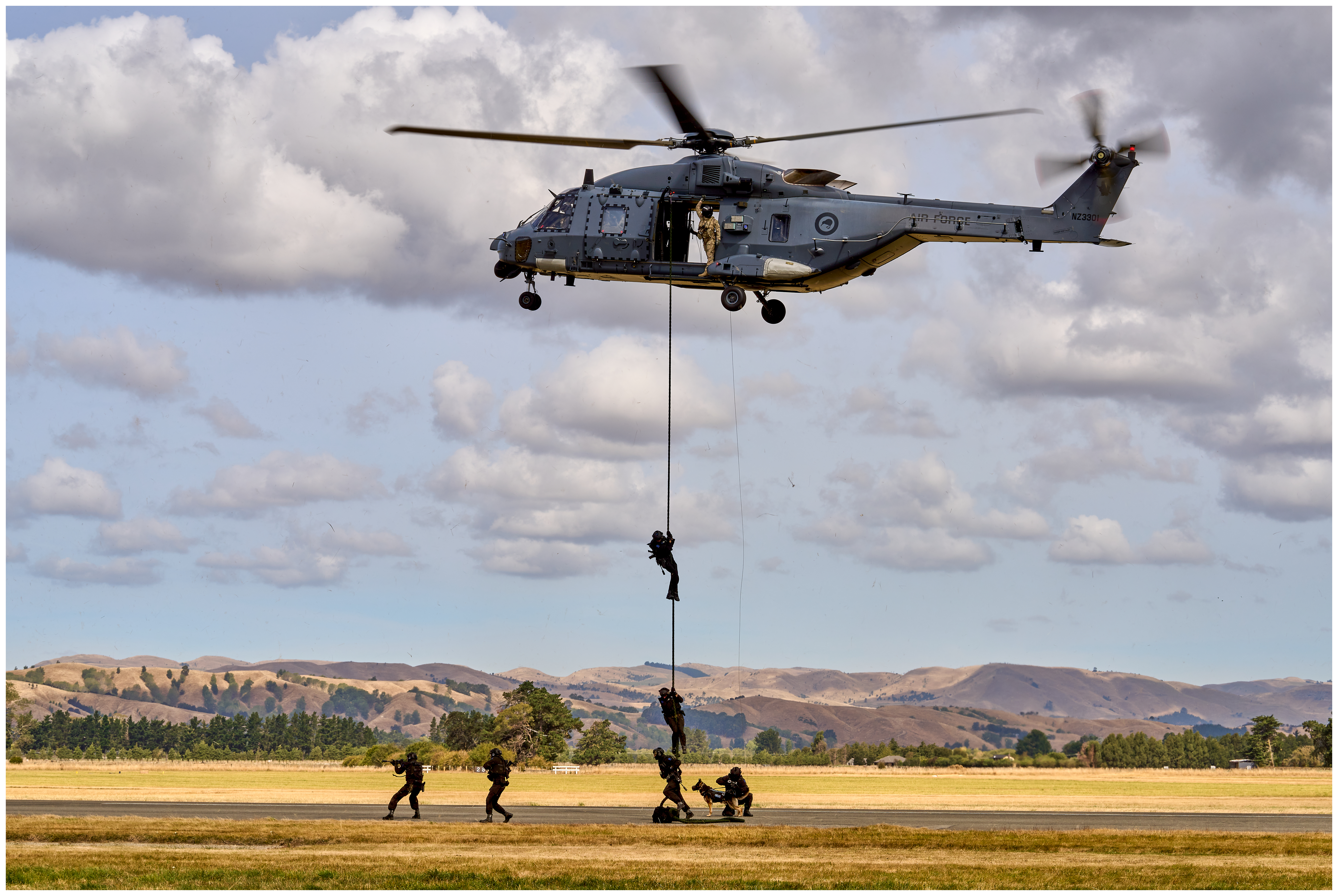
RNZAF NH90 on displays at Wings Over Wairarapa 2021

In April 2016, NH90s flew 160 hours during relief missions in Fiji following the devastation of Cyclone Winston, and transported a variety of staff to different locations. The NH90 served alongside the NZ Sea sprites, and with additional logistical support from fixed wing aircraft. After the Kaikōura earthquakes in November 2016, the NH90s were critical in delivering aid and supplies to the area. They also assisted with civilian evacuations of foreign nationals.

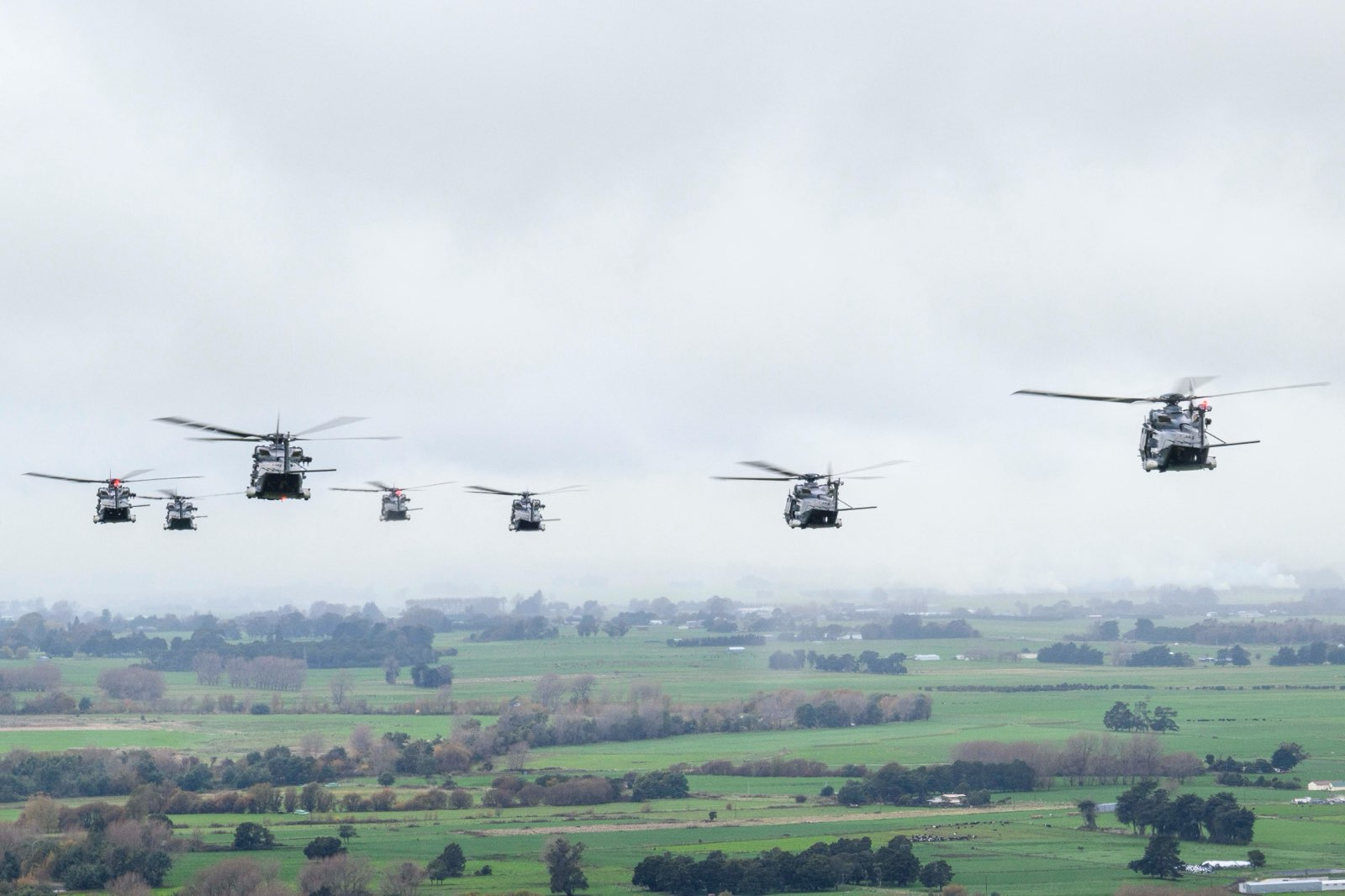
A formation of seven NH90s flies over the Manawatū region

In April 2017, the RNZAF's NH90 fleet was grounded following an in-flight single engine failure which forced an emergency landing.

In November 2021, New Zealand NH90, NZ3302, became the first of its type to reach 2,000 flying hours. According to the RNZAF, despite being delivered years after other customers, high serviceability rates allow New Zealand NH90s to fly more hours per aircraft than other operators. New Zealand states it was getting acceptable flight hours from its fleet and was not going to change its maintenance regime. In May 2025, the RNZAF flew a formation flight of 7 of the 8 airframes in the fleet from Base Ohakea, displaying their continued high availability rate.

In September 2025, two New Zealand NH90s flew from Cairns, Australia, to Port Moresby in Papua New Guinea. The 838 km flight across the Coral Sea, which took four hours to complete, was the longest NH90 flight conducted by the RNZAF and necessitated two 500 kg external gas tanks and an additional internal gas tank as a reserve. It was the first time New Zealand NH90s had flown between two countries.

=== Norway ===
In 2001, Norway ordered 14 NH90s for the Royal Norwegian Navy and Norwegian Coast Guard, originally set to be delivered in 2005–2008. This move came as part of the Nordic Standard Helicopter Program along with Sweden and Finland. In December 2011, the first NH90 was delivered. In July 2012, the Norwegian Deputy Defence Minister Roger Ingebrigtsen announced that "once our current Westland Lynx helicopters reach their end of life in 2014, we are going to have replacement helicopters on our naval vessels. If the NH90 hasn't been delivered, we will purchase another helicopter considering that the aircraft were to be delivered by 2005, and that delivery is yet to start by 2012, our confidence in the producer isn't exactly on the rise" In August 2012, it was reported that the Royal Norwegian Air Force would recommend that the Ministry of Defence contact Sikorsky to check if H-60 Seahawk variants, such as the MH-60R, could be a viable NH90 alternative for anti-submarine warfare (ASW) duties. Defence Minister Espen Barth Eide stated "We still believe the marine version of the NH90 to be the optimal platform, and we hope to purchase it, but there are limits to our patience." By January 2016, six NH90s had been delivered.

A February 2018 report by the Norwegian Armed Forces found that its NH90 fleet offered insufficient flight hours for the intended roles; this report advised that all helicopters be converted to the ASW role as required by the Royal Norwegian Navy, as opposed to current plans which see 6 of the 14 NH90s in that role, and the rest configured for Norwegian Coast Guard duties. The Norwegian Ministry of Defence stated that it would consider the report's recommendations. In September 2018, the Norwegian Armed Forces reversed course via an updated study which affirmed that, under certain conditions, the requirements for both the navy and coast guard can be met with 14 NH90s; these conditions specifically state good spare parts availability, sufficient aircraft for maintenance scheduling, and a sufficient overhaul capacity. Norwegian Minister of Defence Frank Bakke-Jensen added that, although the inauguration is challenging, the ministry holds on to the timeline in which phasing in will be completed by 2022.

In February 2022, the Norwegian Minister of Defence again threatened to terminate the NH90 contract due to concerns over new delays and NHI not meeting contractual obligations, considering sourcing alternative helicopters. In June 2022, the Norwegian Minister of Defence Bjørn Arild Gram announced the Norwegian Defence Material Agency was given the task to terminate the NH90 contract due to NHI not meeting contractual obligations, and announced that the NH90 is taken out of operation with immediate effect. Ten months later, Gram stated that the Lockheed Martin MH-60R Seahawk would replace the NH90. Norway also operated Westland Sea Kings and AW101 Merlins.

In November 2025, the Norwegian government reached a settlement with NHIndustries. As part of the settlement, NHIndustries is to pay the Norwegian government €305 million, in addition to a further €70 million in existing bank guarantees. In turn, the Norwegian government is to return all of its NH90 helicopters and associated spare parts and related equipment to NHIndustries.

=== Oman ===
In July 2004, the Sultanate of Oman issued an order for a total of 20 NH90 TTHs for the Royal Air Force of Oman (RAFO). To cope with the extreme flight conditions of the Middle East, RAFO NH90s are equipped with enhanced power plants; the type is to replace the Agusta/Bell 205A and Agusta/Bell 212 used for tactical transport, and search and rescue operations. On 23 June 2010, the first two NH90 TTHs were delivered to the RAFO at Musona Air Base. By July 2012, ten NH90s had been delivered to the RAFO; in Omani service, the NH90 has established an endurance record, flying 700 nautical miles (1,300 km; 810 mi) without refuelling during a 5-hour 21 minute-long mission. The Oman NH90 are known to use 20mm gun pods, as opposed to smaller calibre door guns.

=== Qatar ===
In 2014, Qatar announced that it was set to spend $2.76 billion on procuring NH90s to modernizing its military helicopter fleet. A contract valued at €3 billion was signed at the Dimdex defence exhibition on 14 March 2018, which finalised the purchase of 28 NH90s, comprising 16 NH90s for tactical transport and 12 NH90s for naval purposes. On 20 August 2018, Leonardo announced the contract with Qatar was made effective for a total sum of US$3.7 billion, covering the agreed upon number of NH90s, with an option with six more of each type.

On 23 December 2020, the first flights for Qatari-bound NH90s were being conducted for general evaluation. The first two NH90 for Qatar were handed over in March 2022.

=== Spain ===
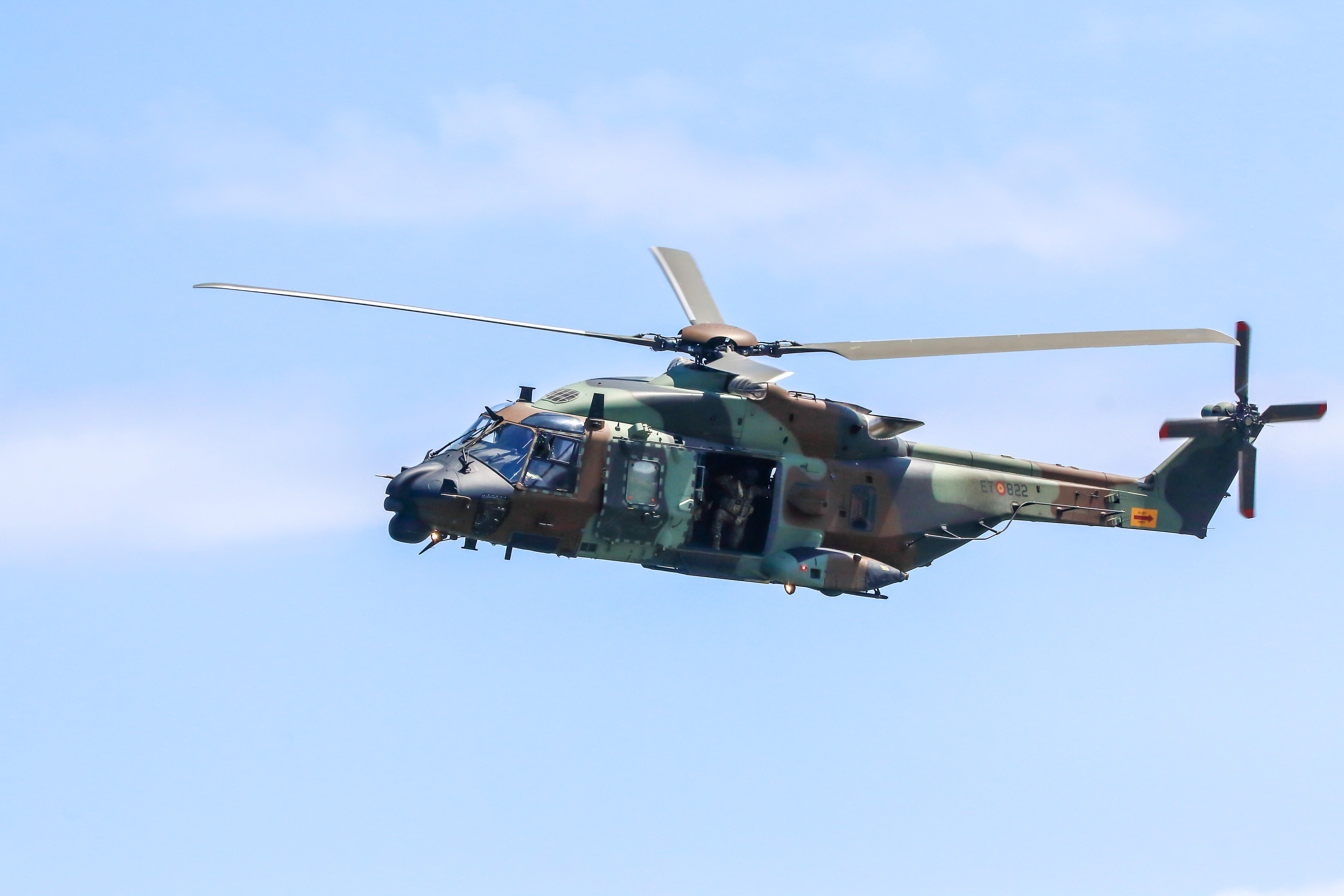
Spanish NH90

On 20 May 2005 the Council of Ministers authorised the acquisition of 45 NH90 TTHs; in December 2006, it was announced that a procurement contract for the Spanish Armed Forces had been signed. The Spanish NH90 variant features domestically assembled General Electric CT7-8F5 engines, a customised communications suite, and Indra-developed electronic warning systems. The original budget for the procurement was for €1,260 million; by 2010, this had grown to €2,463M. In June 2012, it was announced that Spain was negotiating to cut its purchase to 37 aircraft. On 18 December 2014, Spain took delivery of the first NH90 TTH, which had been assembled at Airbus Helicopters Albacete facility; by this point, the order had been reduced to a total of 22 NH90s of the TTH variant. Spain chose the GE CT7-8F5 turbine engine for its fleet.

In January 2018, NHIndustries president Vincent Dubrule stated he was confident Spain would place a follow-on order by the end of 2018 for an additional 23 TTH NH90s, bringing the total back up to 45. In September 2018, the Spanish government agreed to the purchase of the additional 23 TTH NH90s, including seven for naval purposes. Spain stated in early 2023 the NH90 was "working perfectly".

The Spanish Ministry of Defence is evaluating the possibility to integrate weapons and systems to the potential NH90 HSPN for the Spanish Navy. In December 2024, Spain took deliver of its first Standard 3 NH90, which featured a gross take off weight of 11 tonnes, enhanced communication and safety features among other enhancements.

=== Sweden ===
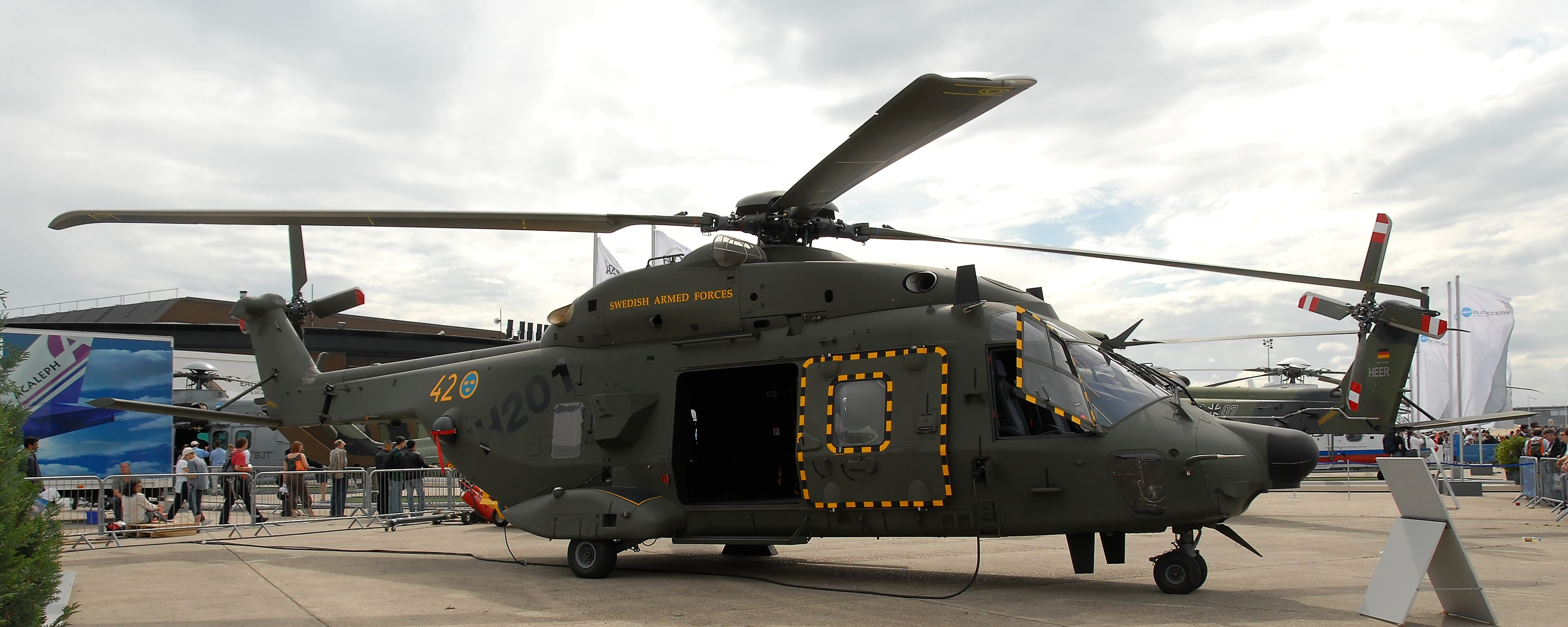
The High-Cabin version of the NH90 at the 2007 Paris Air Show

In 2001, Sweden signed a contract for 18 NH90 TTH, made up of 13 TTT (Note: Tactical Troop Transport)/SAR and 5 SAR/ASW to be operated by the Swedish Air Force. The decision to order the NH90 was made as part of the Nordic Standard Helicopter program along with Norway and Finland; the Swedish version is the High Cabin Variant (HCV). Because of renewed foreign submarine activity at the Swedish coast in 2014, it was decided in 2015 that four TTT/SAR would be modified to SAR/ASW to increase the anti-submarine warfare capability, so there will be 9 TTT/SAR and 9 SAR/ASW. The NH90 is known as the Helikopter 14 (Hkp 14) in Swedish service, the FOC version of TTT/SAR are designated Hkp 14E and the FOC version of SAR/ASW are designated Hkp 14F.

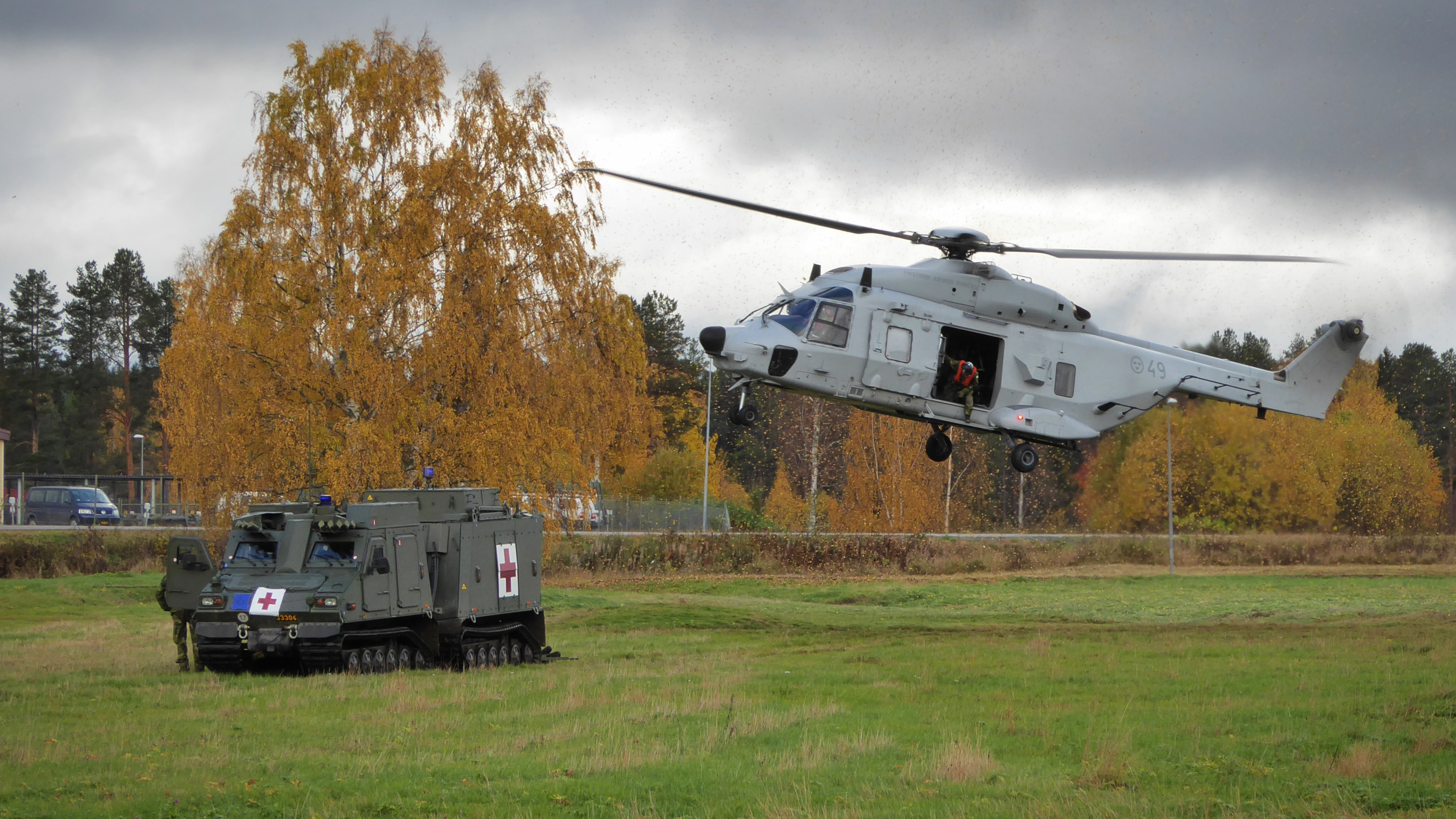
Swedish NH90 exercises in 2017

Swedish Hkp 14 are used for antisubmarine operations, troop transport, search and rescue, and medical evacuations.

Sweden did not expect its NH90s to be operational until 2020 and ordered 15 UH-60M Black Hawks in 2011, deploying four of its new Black Hawks to Afghanistan in March 2013. In December 2015, the first Swedish NH90 in a full ASW configuration was delivered. On 1 November 2022, the Swedish Supreme Commander, General Michael Byden, announced that Sweden's NH90s will be replaced with S-70 (H-60) variants and a yet-to-be-determined type. In December 2023, Sweden finished upgrades on the SAR version of its NH90 fleet.

== Order campaigns ==
The NH90 has been considered by many helicopter procurements, however some did not lead to helicopter delivery.

Portugal

Portugal was the fifth nation to join the programme with an order for ten transport NH90 in June 2001; it was intended for these to equip the Portuguese Army Light Aviation Unit. However, in July 2012, fiscal consequences of the Great Recession led Portugal to cancel the order, despite having already spent €87m on the project, to save another €420m in acquisition and running costs to 2020.

Saudi Arabia

In July 2006, the Saudi Government agreed to purchase 64 NH90s. In October 2007, the government changed its plans, and agreed to buy 150 Russian-made Mi-35 and Mi-17 helicopters instead.

India

In September 2008, the Indian Defence Ministry launched the Multi Role Helicopter (MRH) tender to acquire 16 helicopters to replace the Sea King Mk 42B/C fleet of the Indian Navy. An earlier tender issued in 2006 had been cancelled. The helicopters were required to undertake both anti-submarine and anti-surface warfare missions. There were two contender, Sikorsky S-70B Seahawk and NHIndustries NH90. Sikorsky and NHIndustries submitted their commercial bids in 2009–10. The trials were held from March 2011 and lasted till end of the year. However, there were delays attributed to NHI's complaint of "undue technical waivers" given to Sikorsky raised in 2011–12. Though these issues were resolved in 2012-end, further delays followed as Finmeccanica, holding a 32% stake in NHIndustries, was involved in the 2013 Indian helicopter bribery scandal allegation. On 5 December 2014, Sikorsky, then a subsidiary of United Technologies, announced its selection by the Indian Navy to supply 16 S-70B Seahawk helicopters with an option for eight more in later stages. However, the project got entirely terminated due to overpricing and a deadlock during cost negotiations.

Ultimately, 24 MH-60Rs were sought through the Foreign Military Sales (FMS) route in 2018–19. The deal was signed in February 2020. The deliveries are expected to be complete by 2026-end.

Egypt

In July 2015, the Egyptian Navy entered negotiations for the purchase of 5 NH90 NFHs; these were intended to serve on board its newly acquired FREMM frigate Tahya Misr and 4 Gowind corvettes that were also on order. These NH90s would all be of French standard. In October 2015, it was reported that negotiations for a "large quantity" of NH90s had reached an advanced stage. In April 2019, it was announced that Egypt was ordering the AW149 and not the NH90.

South Korea

South Korea approved a nearly 2.87 trillion won (US$2.23 billion) to procure naval helicopters to replace its aging Lynx helicopters, and the NH90 is planned to be one of the candidates.

Vietnam

It was revealed that Vietnam has signed an undisclosed memorandum with Airbus regarding the NH90 in 2025, which was reportedly being finalized in 2026.

== Variants ==
User	TTH	NFH
Australia	Retired	
Belgium	Retired	Yes
Finland	Yes	
France	Yes	Yes
Germany	Yes	Yes
Greece	Yes	
Italy	Yes	Yes
Netherlands		Yes
New Zealand	Yes	
Norway		Cancelled
Oman	Yes	
Qatar	Yes	Yes
Spain	Yes	Yes
Sweden	Retiring	Retiring

There are two main variants: the NATO Frigate Helicopter (NFH), intended for naval operations, and the Tactical Transport Helicopter (TTH), intended for land-based operations. Many variants are produced for specific roles, such as medical evacuation, search and rescue, and special operations.

=== NFH: NATO Frigate Helicopter ===
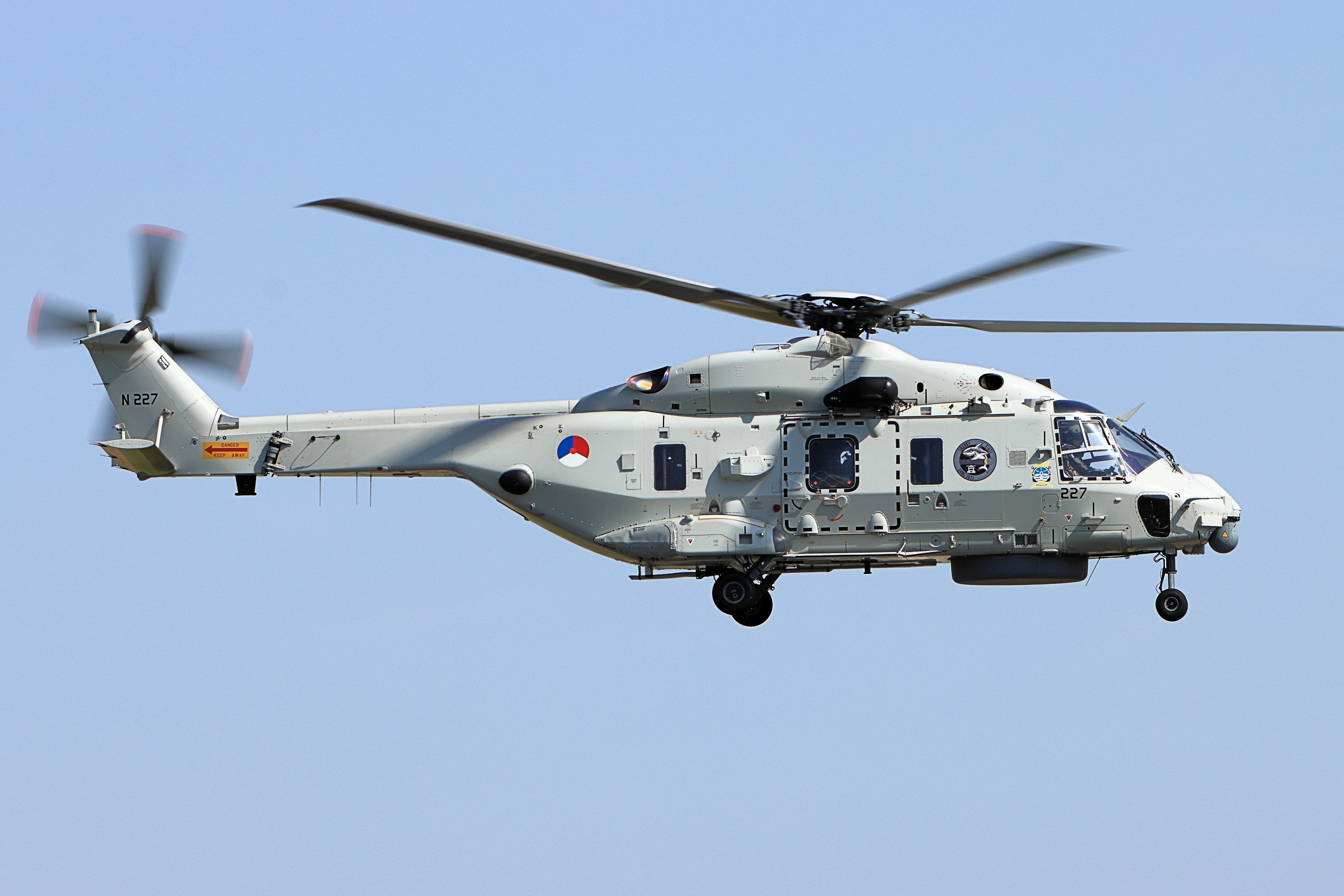
An NH90 NATO Frigate Helicopter (NFH)

The NATO Frigate Helicopter variant is intended for autonomous anti-submarine warfare (ASW) and anti-surface unit warfare (ASuW). It is primarily deployed from naval ships. These aircraft are equipped for operations during the day and night, in adverse weather, and with severe ship motion. Additional roles include anti-air warfare support, vertical replenishment (VERTREP), search and rescue, and troop transport. The NFH is differentiated from the baseline design in its folding tail and rotors and a stronger undercarriage, suitable for marine landings.

==== NH90 HSPN ====
Potential Spanish variant of the NH90 to be used by the Spanish Navy, with Spanish integrated equipment, new weapons such as the NSM-AL, and also communication equipment.

==== NH90 NFH Caïman ====
French Navy designation for NH90 NFH.

==== NH90 Sea Lion ====
German Navy development of the French NH90 NFH. The Sea Lion features a reduced set of sensors as its main tasks are search and rescue and ship based transport (VERTREP and Special Forces). It is usually unarmed though door guns can be installed. The Sea Lion's first flight was on 8 December 2016 and service deliveries started in October 2019.

==== NH90 Sea Tiger ====
Another German Navy variant of the NFH90 intended for ASW and ASuW. The first Sea Tigers were ordered in 2019 with a potential total of up to 31.

==== SH-90A ====
Italian Navy designation for NH90 NFH.

=== TTH: Tactical Transport Helicopter ===
The Tactical Transport Helicopter is intended for transport of up to 20 troops or more than 2,500 kg of cargo and for search and rescue. It can be adapted to medical evacuation (MEDEVAC) and casualty evacuation (CASEVAC) missions by fitting up to 12 stretchers. Additional roles include special operations, electronic warfare, airborne command post, parachuting, VIP transport and flight training.

==== Helikopter 14 (HKP 14) ====
This is the variant of the Swedish Armed Forces, it was designed with a higher cabin, and is referred to as the HCV for High Cabin Version. It was designed as such to enable the capacity to be used as an air ambulance. The cabin height is increased by 24 cm (9.4 in) to 1.82 m (6.0 ft). The high ceiling was considered as necessary as the standard NH90 has a cabin height of 1.57 m (5.2 ft), which was insufficient to comply with peacetime work safety regulations.

The HKP 14 is equipped with a Saab-developed Tactical Mission System. The fleet consists of two subvariants of the TTH (known as TTT for Tactical Troop Transports by the Finnish and the Swedish):

- The HKP 14E produced in 9 units, a land operations variant.
- The HKP 14F produced in 9 units, a naval operations variant, equipped with sonar for ASW mission, a radar for SAR and for ASuW missions.

==== HT-29 Caimán ====
Spanish Army designation for NH90 GSPA TTH.

==== MRH-90 Taipan ====
Australian Defence Force designation for its NH90 TTH Multirole Helicopters (retired).

==== NH90 TTH Caïman ====
French Army designation for NH90 TTH.

==== NH90 TTH Caïman Standard 2 ====
French Army designation for NH90 TTH variant for special operations forces.

==== UH-90A ====
Italian Army designation for the NH90 TTH.

==== MH-90A ====
Italian Navy variant of the NH90 TTH.

=== MTT: Maritime Tactical Transport ===
The MTT is a hybrid of the TTH and NFH variants, combining the land-based configuration of the TTH with specialized maritime features of the NFH, including folding rotor blades, a folding tail boom, and a strengthened undercarriage. The variant was first announced in February 2019 and has attracted interest from the Spanish Armed Forces, which may add it to existing orders. Ten units were procured by the Italian Armed Forces, designated as the MH-90 Maritime Italian Navy Tactical Transport (MITT) TTH.

== Operators ==
=== Current operators ===
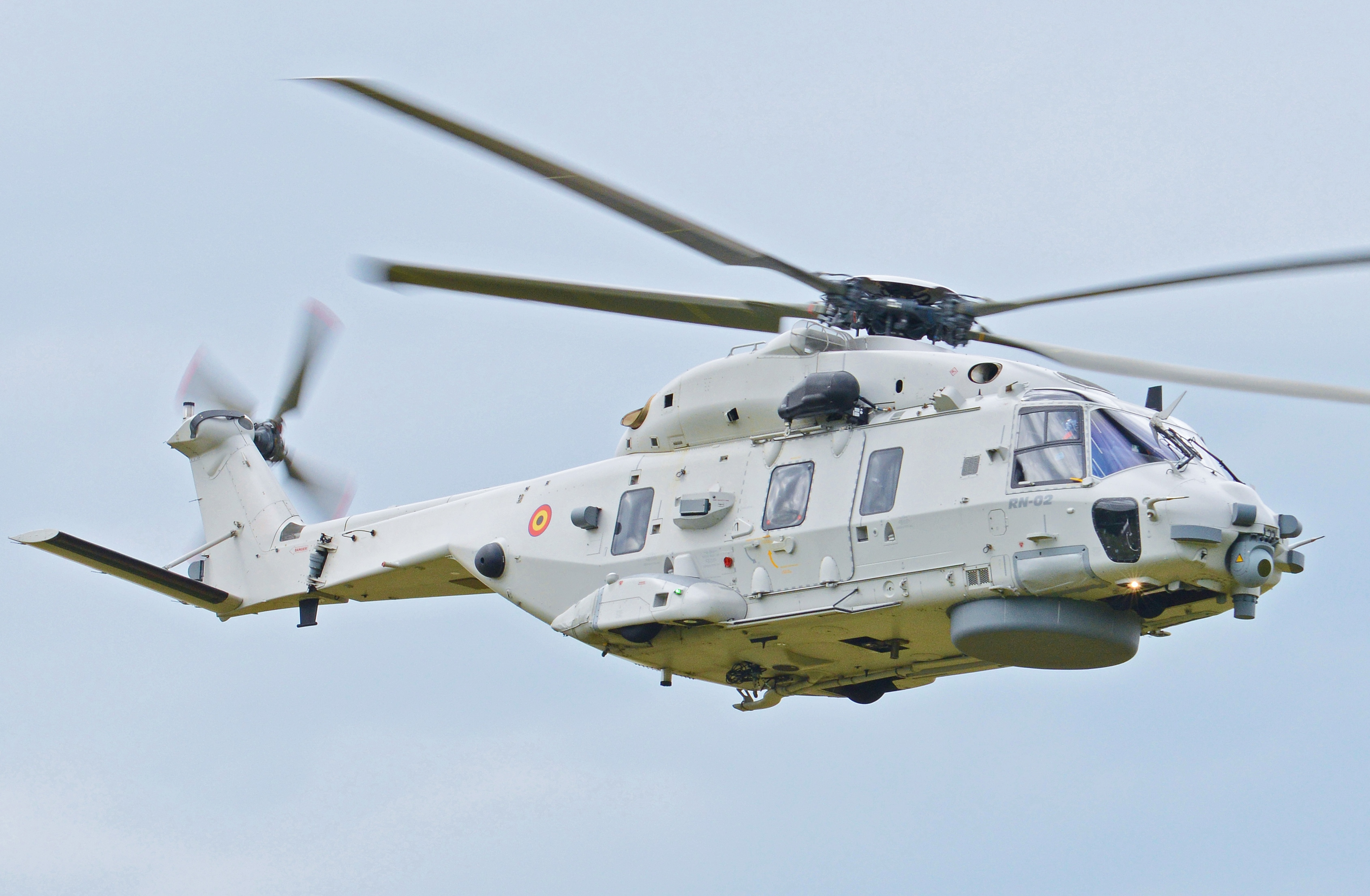
NH90 NFH of the Belgian Air Force

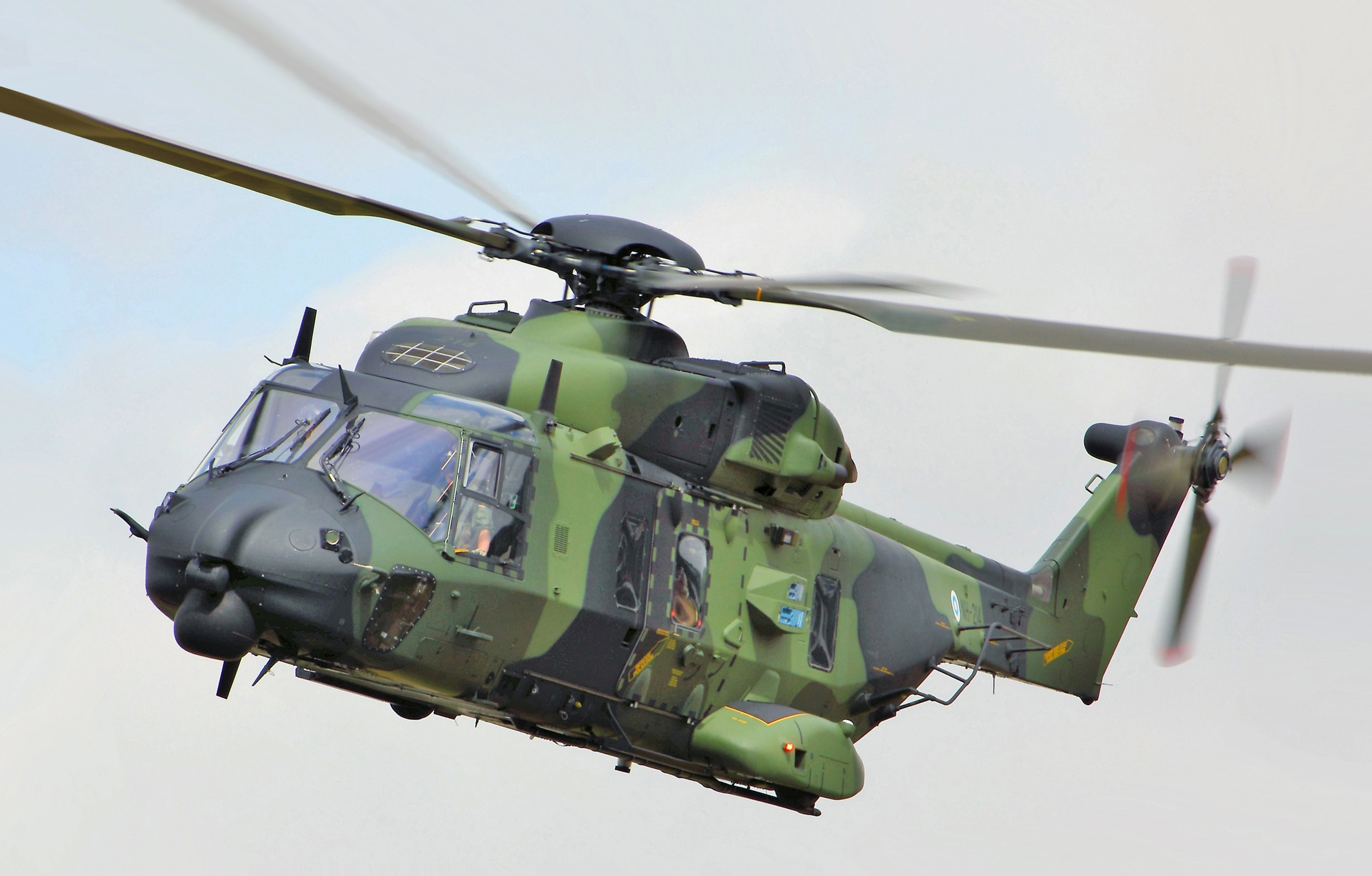
A Finnish Army NH90 performing over RIAT 2013

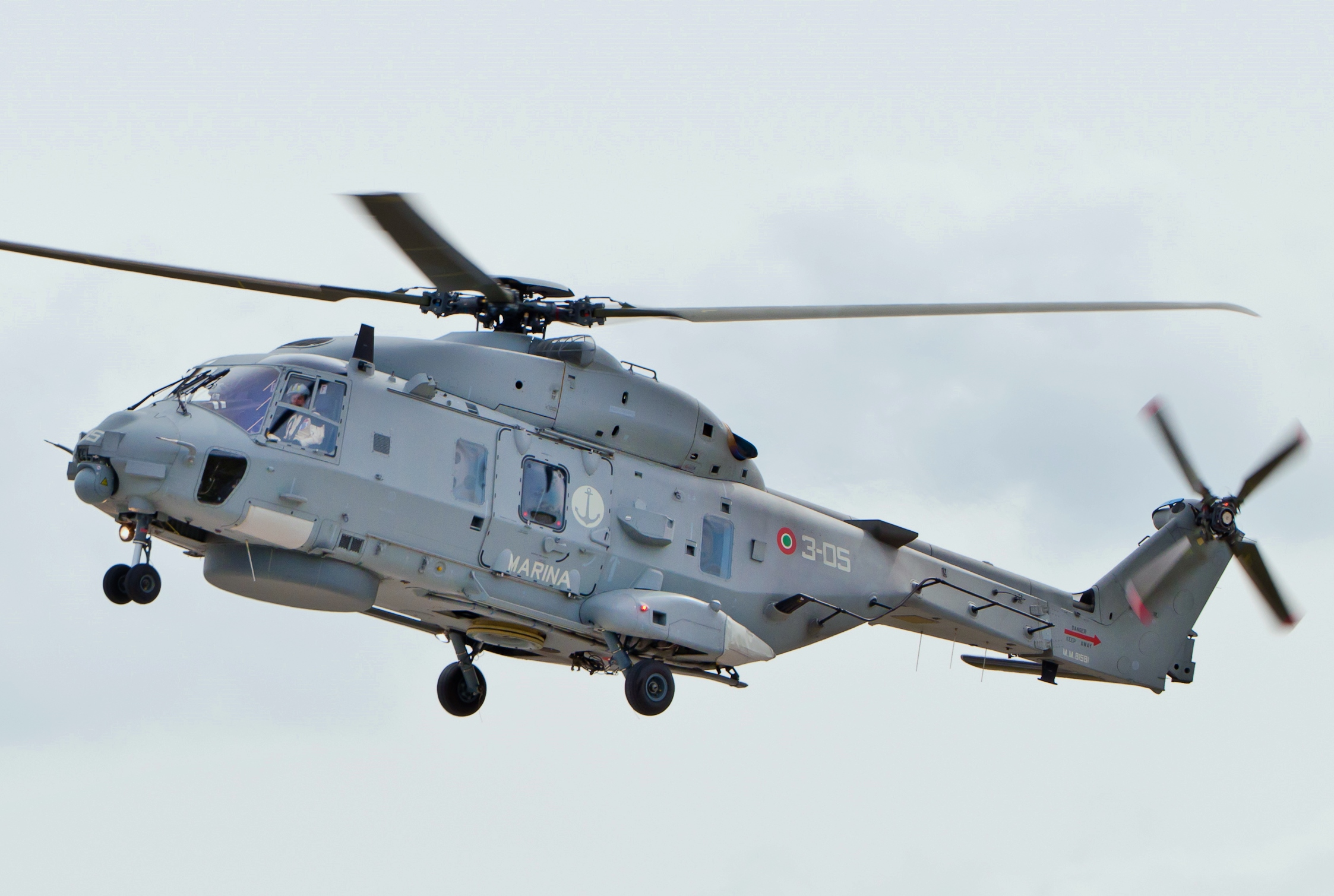
Italian Navy NH90 NFH in flight, 2012

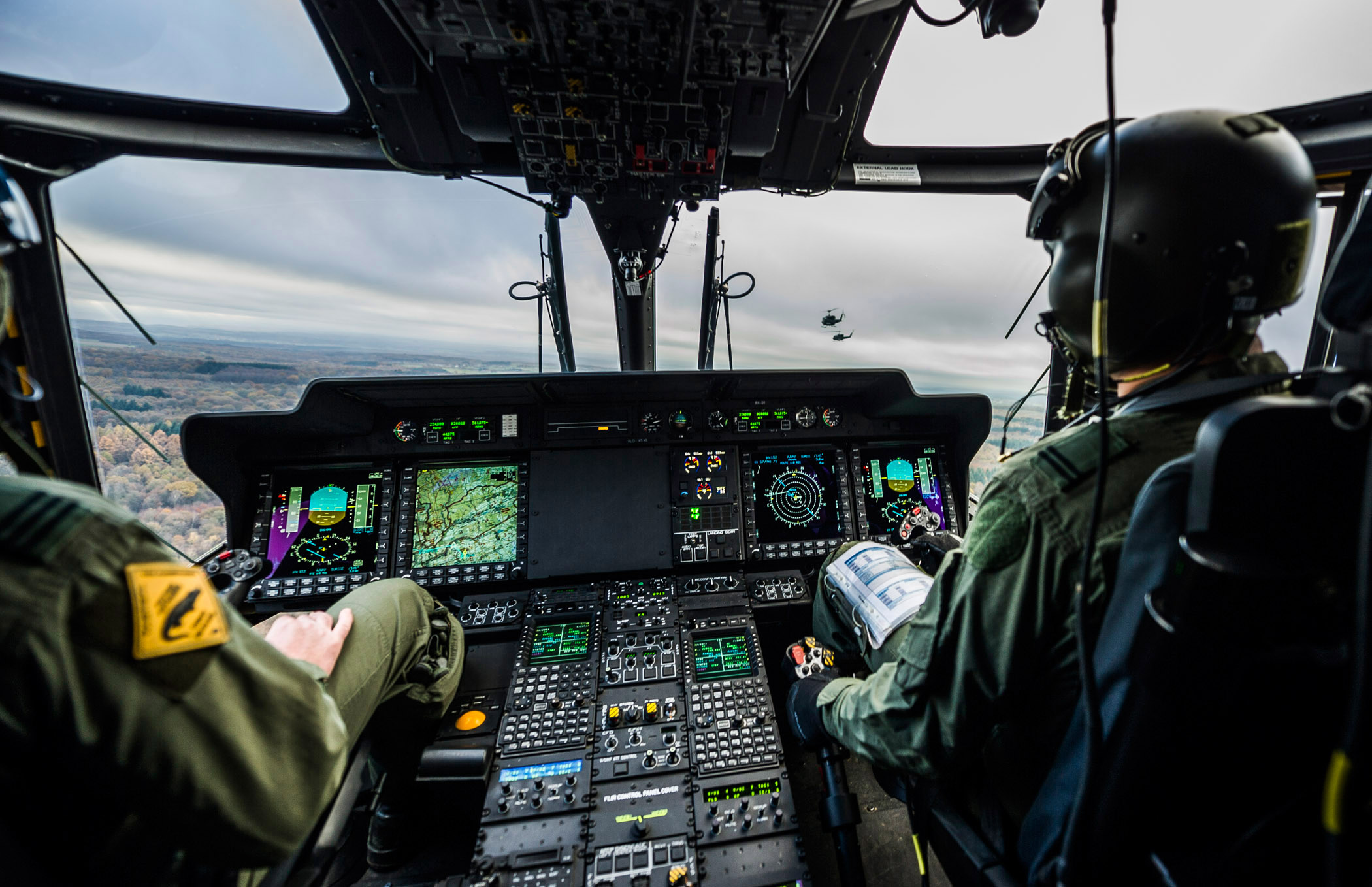
Cockpit view while in flight

Belgium

- Belgian Air Force

Finland

- Finnish Army

France

- French Army
- French Navy

Germany

- German Army
- German Navy

Greece

- Hellenic Army

Italy

- Italian Army
- Italian Navy

Netherlands

- Royal Netherlands Navy

New Zealand

- Royal New Zealand Air Force

Oman

- Royal Air Force of Oman

Qatar

- Qatar Emiri Air Force

Spain

- Spanish Army
- Spanish Air and Space Force
- Spanish Navy

Sweden

- Swedish Air Force

Saudi Arabia

- Saudi National Guard

=== Former operators ===
Australia

- Australian Army, retired in 2023
- Royal Australian Navy, withdrawn in 2022

Norway

- Royal Norwegian Air Force, retired in 2022

== Accidents ==
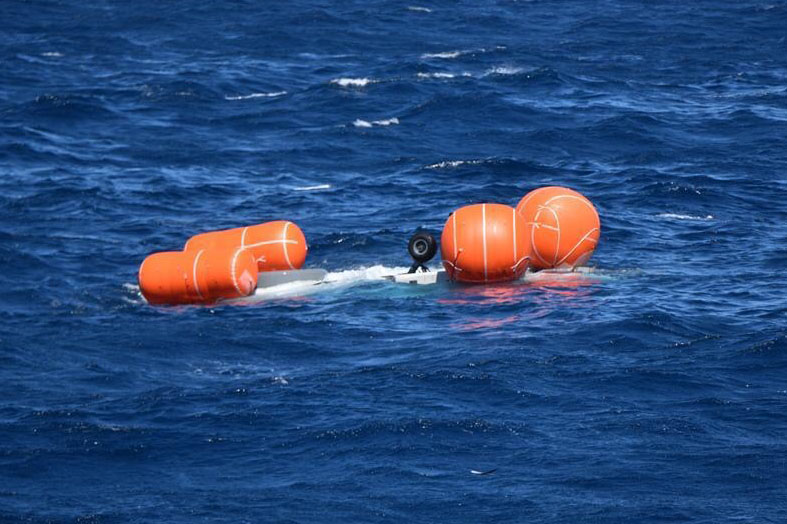
The capsized but floating NH90 that crashed near Aruba in 2020

From 2008 there have been reports of at least 11 accidents involving NH90 of various types.

Examples

- In April 2010, an Australian MRH-90 suffered a single engine failure near Adelaide, landing safely at RAAF Base Edinburgh Australia grounded their MRH-90 fleet due to engine issues. The cause of the failure was determined to be contact between the compressor blade and the engine casing; new preventative inspections were enacted and flights resumed in July 2010. One factor stated for the engine failure was complications relating to an inflight engine restart.
- In March 2023, an Australian MRH-90 with ten aboard experienced an engine failure and ditched in Jervis Bay with everyone surviving. The helicopter's flotation system was deployed, allowing it to float, and it was towed onto a nearby beach.
- In July 2023, an Australian MRH-90 crashed at night during Exercise Talisman Sabre off the coast of Hamilton Island, Queensland, with the loss of its four crew. A debris field was discovered near the presumed crash site, containing parts of the airframe and human remains at a depth of 40 metres, consistent with a catastrophic impact. The cause remained under investigation as of late 2023.

== Specifications (NH90) ==

Data from AgustaWestland, Airbus Helicopters, The International Directory of Military Aircraft, 2002/2003

General characteristics

- Crew: 2 flight crew + loadmaster / sensor operator
- Capacity: 20 seated troops; or 12 medevac stretchers; or 2 NATO pallets; or 4,200 kg (9,259 lb) external slung load
- Length: 16.13 m (52 ft 11 in)
- Empty weight: 6,400 kg (14,110 lb)
- Max takeoff weight: 10,600 kg (23,369 lb)
- Powerplant: 2 × General Electric CT7-8E turboshaft engines, 1,845 kW (2,474 hp) each (option)
- Powerplant: 2 × Rolls-Royce Turbomeca RTM322-1/9 turboshaft engines, 1,802 kW (2,417 hp) each (option)
- Main rotor diameter: 16.3 m (53 ft 6 in)
- Main rotor area: 208.699 m^{2} (2,246.42 sq ft) root: ONERA OA312; tip: ONERA OA409/OA407

Performance

- Maximum speed: 300 km/h (190 mph, 160 kn)
- Range: 800 km (500 mi, 430 nmi) TTH

1,000 km (620 mi; 540 nmi) NFH

- Endurance: 5 hours
- Service ceiling: 6,000 m (20,000 ft)
- Rate of climb: 8 m/s (1,600 ft/min)

Armament

- Guns: 2 door guns
- Missiles: anti-submarine and/or air to surface missiles (NFH version), 20 mm cannon pod and rockets pod (TTH)

Avionics

- FLIR (NFH)
- Thales ENR (NFH)
- Link 11 Datalink
- Link 16 Datalink
- HELRAS dipping sonar (some NFH)
- Flash & TMS 2000 (Fr NFH)

== See also ==
Related development

- NHIndustries MRH-90 Taipan

Aircraft of comparable role, configuration, and era

- AgustaWestland AW149
- AgustaWestland AW159 Wildcat
- Airbus Helicopters H175
- Bell 525 Relentless
- Eurocopter EC 725 (Airbus Helicopters H225M)
- Eurocopter AS532 Cougar (Airbus Helicopters H215M)
- Harbin Z-20
- KAI KUH-1 Surion
- Mil Mi-38
- Sikorsky CH-148 Cyclone
- Sikorsky MH-60R Seahawk
- Sikorsky UH-60 Black Hawk
