= Westair Helicopters =

European helicopter operator

Westair Helicopters S.r.l. is a European based commercial helicopter operator, specialized in offshore transportation services for Oil & Gas Industry.

The airline headquarter is located Via Gabriele D’Annunzio, 4, 21010 Vizzola Ticino (Malpensa Business Park), Italy and operates as per EASA and IOGP standards a fleet of Leonardo AW189, AW139 and AW169 in Africa and Europe.

Airline permanent bases are located in Congo, Gabon, Equatorial Guinea, Namibia and Romania, with temporary based in Mauritania and Sao Tome.

== History ==
Westair Helicopters S.r.l. was founded in 2018 in Italy under Weststar NDD brand by Weststar Aviation Services, Malaysia, to offer helicopter services in Africa to the Oil & Gas Industry.

Two new partners, Westair Aviation, Namibia and Avico Group, France have invested together in 2023 to take the lead of this company and it has been renamed Westair Helicopters accordingly.

Fleet was initially based on Leonardo AW139 and AW169 units.

Super medium Leonardo AW189 has been added to the fleet in 2022, and a first Airbus H225 will be operated from end of 2024.

== Fleet ==
Westair Helicopters operates 14 aircraft in Africa and Europe, all of them being dedicated to Oil and Gas segment.

Aircraft	Number	Notes
Leonardo AW139	6	
Leonardo AW169	4	
Leonardo AW189	4	
Airbus H225	3	To be delivered in 2024/2025
