= Gulf Helicopters =

Qatari helicopter company

Gulf Helicopters Company
IATA	ICAO	Call sign
DOH	OTBD	GHC
- Founded: 1970; 56 years ago
- Fleet size: 54
- Parent company: QatarEnergy (Gulf International Services)
- Headquarters: Doha, Qatar
- Key people: Mohd Hilal M O Al Hilal (Acting CEO)
- Employees: 500+
- Website: https://www.gulfhelicopters.com

Gulf Helicopters Company (GHC) is a Qatari helicopter services provider mainly servicing the oil and gas industry in Middle East, North Africa and Asia. It is a 100% subsidiary of Gulf International Services under the QatarEnergy umbrella, and has its headquarters in Doha, Qatar. Gulf Helicopters services include offshore operations IFR/VFR, emergency medical services, VIP executive transport, support of commercial short-term contracts, load lifting -long & short line, seismic support, onshore transport, tourist flights, aerial photo flights, aerial advertising and banner flying. The company operates a fleet of 54 helicopters and has 500+ employees. They also have clients in Malta, Libya, South Africa, Sudan, Saudi Arabia, Oman, Iran, Pakistan, India, Thailand & Malaysia.

== History ==
Gulf Helicopters Company was established in 1970 in Doha. It was initially set up in February 1973 as a joint venture company involving British Overseas Airways, British European Helicopters and Gulf Aviation Services to provide helicopter service to oil companies developing the offshore exploration and production industry. In March 1977, Gulf Aviation Company Ltd. purchased Gulf Helicopters for the intention of developing economic cooperation and air transportation for the region. Then in June 1998 the company was purchased again by Qatar General Petroleum Corporation. The company is a member of the Helicopter Association International and received the Operator's Safety Award in 1995, 1996, 2013, 2014, 2015, 2016, 2017, 2018, 2019, 2020, 2021 & 2022.

Mohd Hilal M O Al Hilal is the Acting CEO of the company.

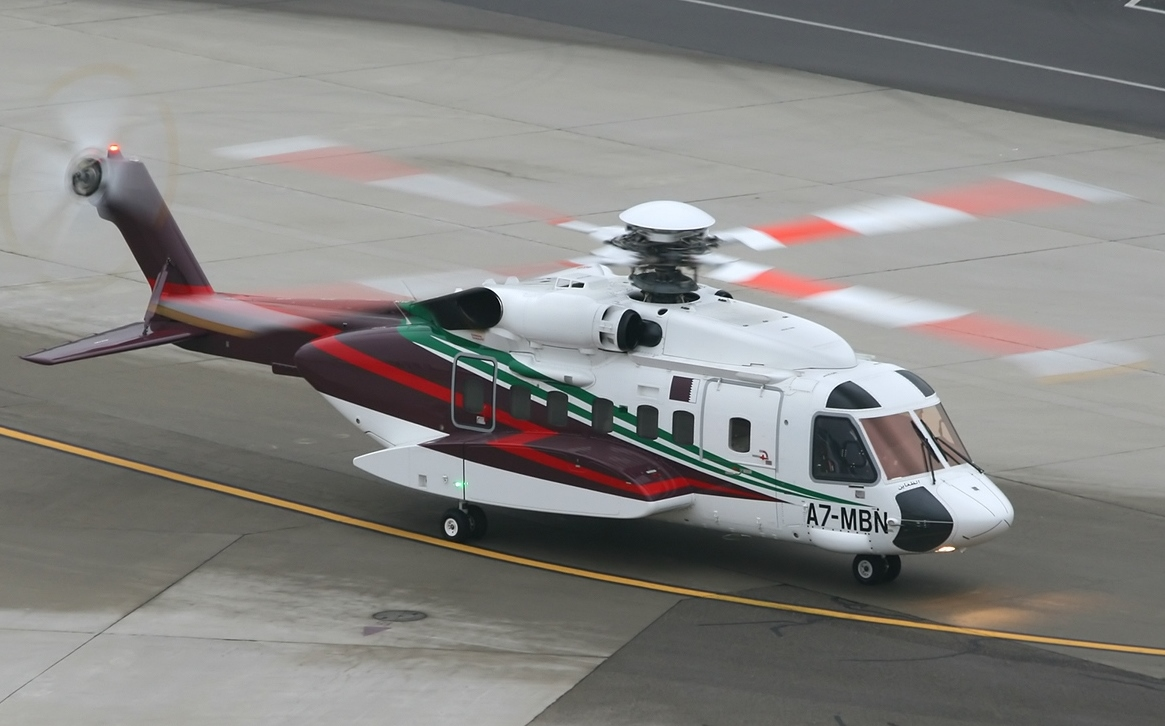
Sikorsky S-92 of Gulf Helicopters Company

== Awards & Certifications ==
- ISO 45001:2018
- ISO 9001:2015
- Helicopter Association International (HAI) Operator Safety Award 2022
- FAA Certification as Repair Station
- EASA Part 147 Approval
- Foreign Maintenance Org - PACA Oman
- QCAA Approval for CAMO
- EASA Part 145 Approval
- QCAA Maintenance Org. Approval
- Rotodyne Aerospace Ground Equipment Authorized Dealer Certificate
- Eurami Board Awards Redstar Aviation (Turkey)
- Leonardo Helicopters - Authorized Service Centre
- DGCA India Certification for Maintenance Organization
- Leonardo Authorized Training Centre
- Pratt & Whitney Canada Premium Service Provider
- Libyan CAA Part 145 Approval

== Affiliates ==
- Air Ocean Maroc (Morocco)
- Gulf Med Aviation Services Limited (Malta)
- Al Maha Aviation Company (Libya)
- Redstar Havacilik Hizmetleri A.S. (Turkey)

== Fleet ==
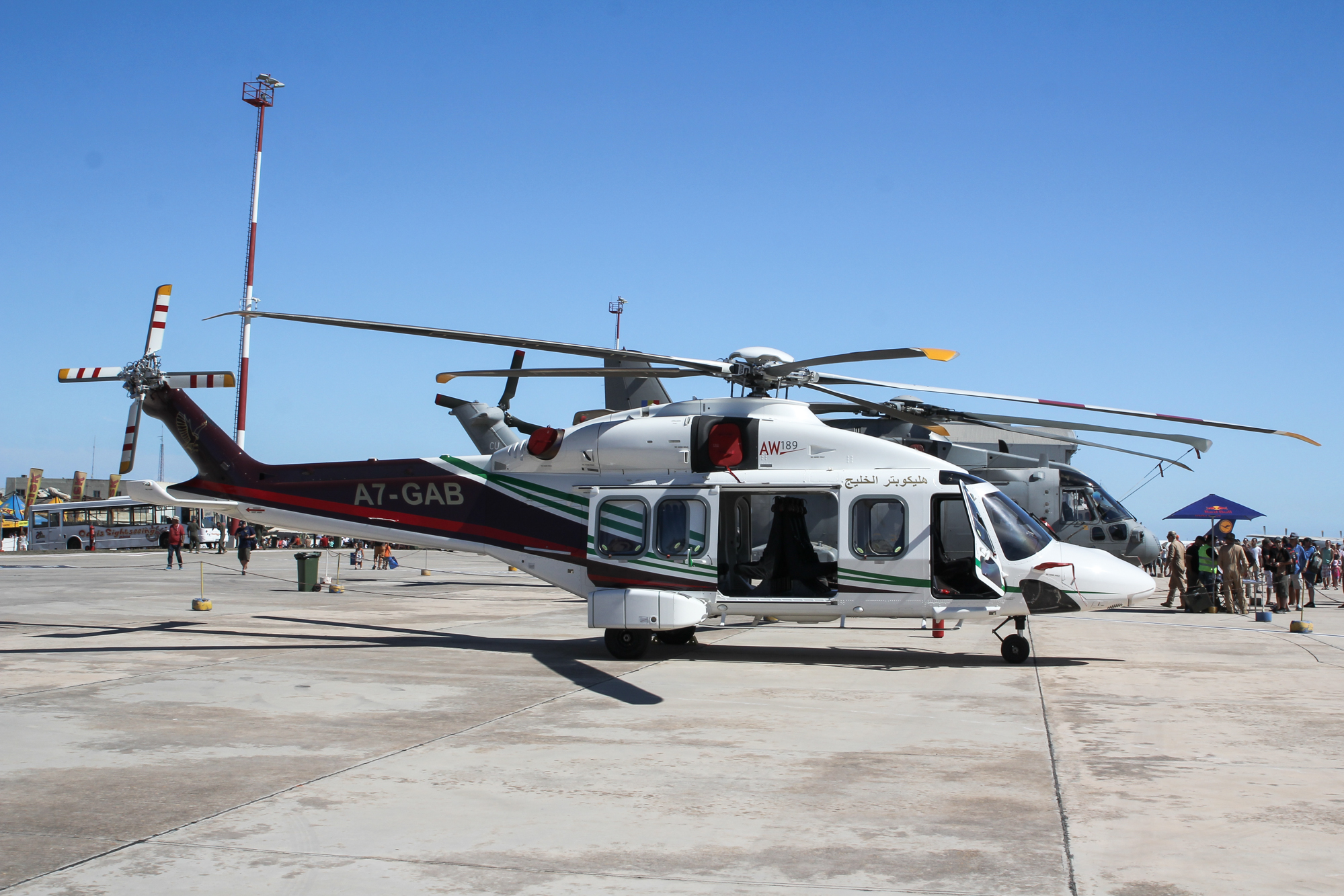
Gulf Helicopters Company AW189; A7-GAB; at the 2015 Malta International Airshow.

Gulf Helicopters currently operates a fleet of 61 helicopters (Nov 2022) including the following:

- 2 Sikorsky S-92
- 30 AgustaWestland AW139
- 5 AgustaWestland AW189
- 1 AS 350
