= AgustaWestland AW189 =

Twin-engined, medium-lift helicopter manufactured by Leonardo

AW189
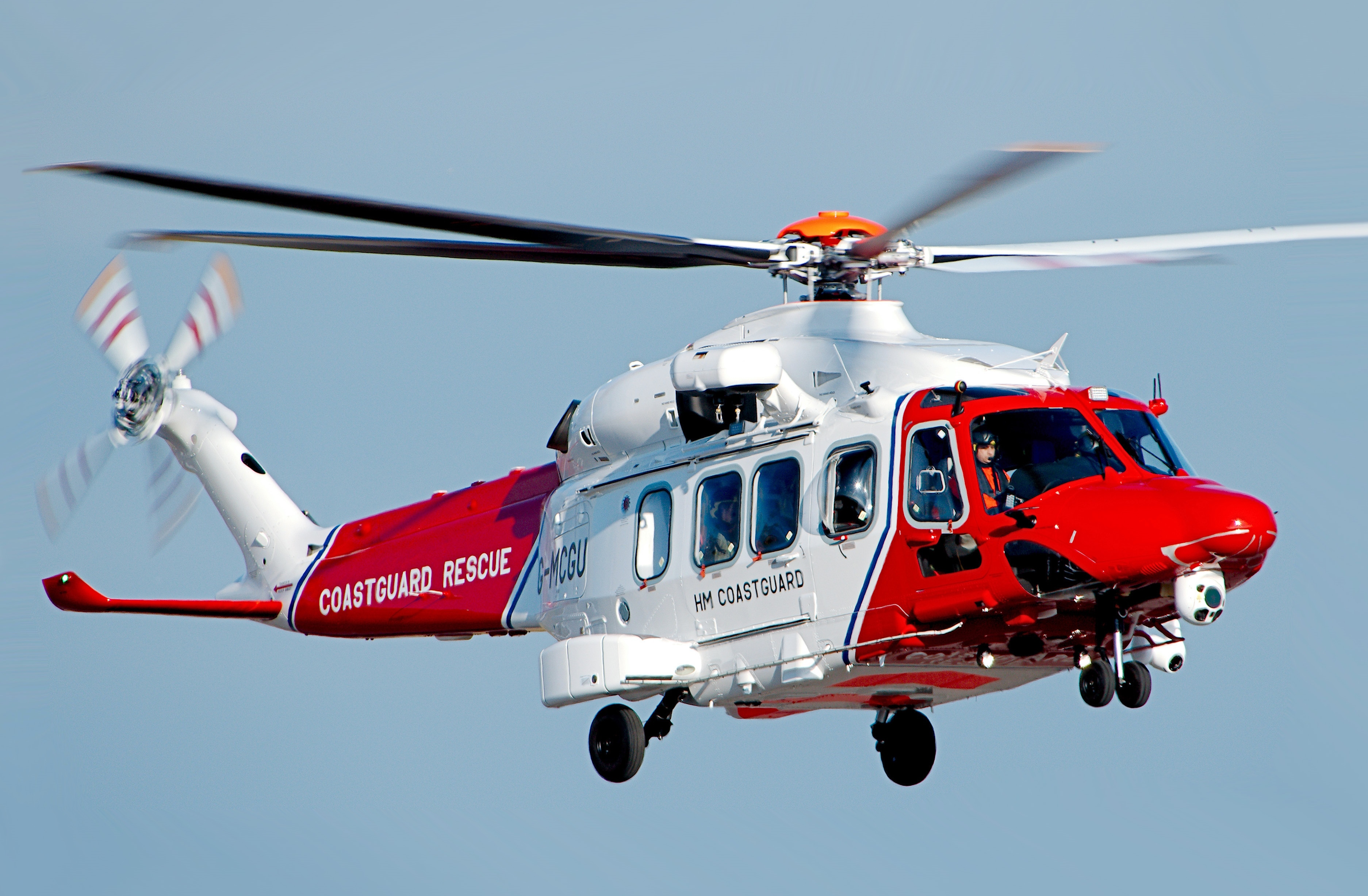
- SAR AgustaWestland AW189

General information
- Type: Super-medium-lift helicopter
- National origin: Italy
- Manufacturer: Leonardo S.p.A. Finmeccanica; AgustaWestland
- Status: In service
- Primary users: Bristow Helicopters Gulf Helicopters
- Number built: 70+

History
- Manufactured: 2011–present
- Introduction date: February 2014
- First flight: 21 December 2011
- Developed from: AgustaWestland AW149

The AgustaWestland AW189 is a twin-engined, super-medium-lift helicopter manufactured by Leonardo S.p.A. It is derived from the AW149, and shares similarities with the AW139 and AW169.

== Development ==
On 20 June 2011, development of the eight-tonne twin-engine AW189 was formally announced by AgustaWestland at the Paris International Air Show; at the time, the company planned to have the new rotorcraft certified by 2013 and in service in 2014. The AW189 is a civil-orientated version of the military AW149, which in turn is an enlarged development of the AW139; in 2011, AgustaWestland CEO Bruno Spagnolini stated that: "The AW139 and the AW189 are two very different aircraft but they both share the same general concept in architecture". AgustaWestland stated it aimed to sell the AW189 for offshore helicopter support, search and rescue (SAR), and passenger transport roles.

On 21 December 2011, the first AW189 conducted its maiden flight from AgustaWestland's facility in Cascina Costa, Italy. During the flight test program, six AW189s were used; these were four prototypes and a pair of pre-production aircraft. The pre-production aircraft were used to develop mission kits and configurations for offshore and SAR roles, enabling these to be immediately certified and available for customer selection. In August 2013, the fifth prototype was dispatched to the UK, so that AgustaWestland's UK branch could begin work on certifying the type for SAR operations. In June 2013, AgustaWestland announced that the AW189 had entered full-scale production.

In October 2013, the first production model performed its first flight; at the same time, work was proceeding on setting up a second production line for the type at AgustaWestland's center in Yeovil, United Kingdom. In February 2014, the AW189 received type certification from the European Aviation Safety Agency (EASA); the Federal Aviation Administration (FAA) issued its certification for the type in March 2015. In August 2015, civil certification for the AW189 was issued by the Interstate Aviation Committee (IAC).

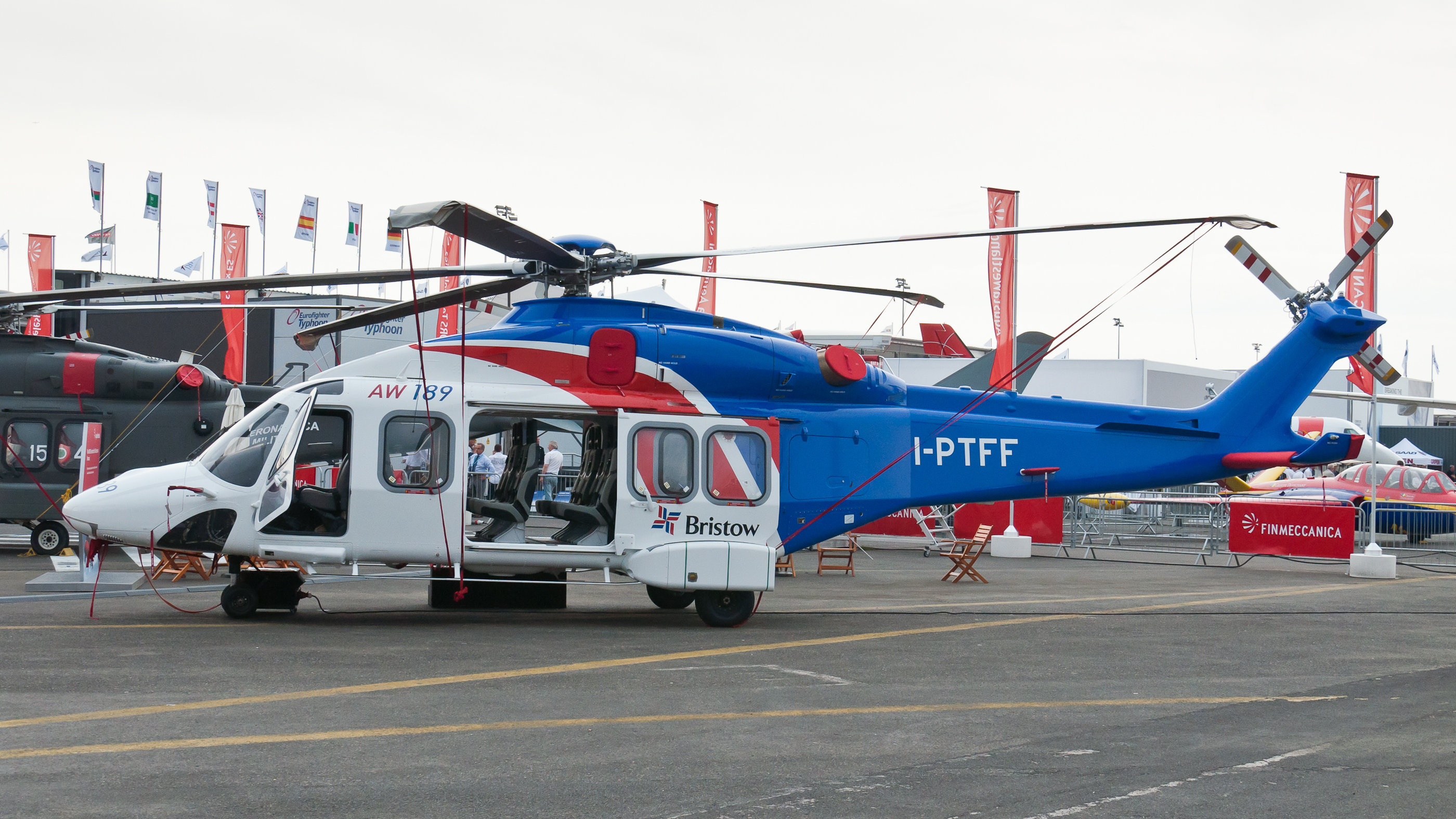
AgustaWestland AW189 at Paris Air Show 2013

In June 2015, it was reported that slow development of the ice-protection systems that to be offered upon the AW189 had delayed the introduction of Bristow Helicopters UK-based SAR operations using the type, at the time being in a state of "operational evaluation". In September 2015, AgustaWestland announced that EASA certification of the AW189's limited ice protection system had been granted, and stated that the rotorcraft was the first in its category to receive such certification. In autumn 2015, AgustaWestland conducted icing trials in Alaska to provide flight within full icing conditions certification as part of efforts to qualify the type for the SAR role; validation of the full-ice protection system was scheduled for mid-2016.

In October 2017, Leonardo announced the development of the AW189K variant, powered by two 2500 hp Aneto-1K turboshafts produced by Safran Helicopter Engines. EASA certification for the AW189K was initially expected in late 2018 this was eventually achieved in June 2020; hot and high operations would benefit from the additional 500shp (370 kW) per engine and the Aneto's specific fuel consumption was planned to be 10% lower than the replaced CT7s. Gulf Helicopters was the launch customer of the AW189K.

== Design ==
The AW189 is a medium-sized twin-engined helicopter with a five-bladed fully articulated main rotor, a four-bladed tail rotor and a retractable tricycle landing gear. It is powered by two General Electric CT7-2E1 turboshaft engines. AgustaWestland refer to the AW189 as being a "super-medium class" helicopter, emphasizing its suitability for long-range operations. During development, the AW189 was designed to comply with the latest international regulatory safety requirements EASA/FAA Part 29, JAR OPS 3/EU-OPS. Of particular importance to the type's use for offshore operations, such as search and rescue and services to the oil and gas industries, the main gearbox has been designed to provide for a 50-minute run-dry capacity, in excess of requirements and a unique feature to the AW189. Aspects of the AW189 are deliberately similar to the AW139 and AW169; these helicopters share similar flight performance characteristics, safety features, and design philosophies. Areas of the aircraft's operation, such as maintenance and the layout of the cockpit, also continue this concept, which reportedly makes operations more cost effective.

The cockpit features high levels of external visibility and advanced situational awareness technologies, and is designed to reduce crew workload and enhance safety. Avionics on the AW189 are fully integrated and include four color LCD panels, a four-axis dual-duplex digital automatic flight control system, autopilot, search/weather radar, cockpit voice recorder, flight data recorder, night vision goggle-compatibility, health and usage monitoring system, moving map system, SATCOM, synthetic vision system, emergency locator system, helicopter terrain avoidance system (HTAWS), traffic collision avoidance system II (TCAS II), direction finder, forward looking infrared (FLIR) camera, and VHF/UHF radio. The avionics were designed to use an open architecture, making customer-specified upgrades and additions easier and enabling additional options.

Dependent on the configuration, the AW189's cabin can accommodate up to 19 passengers and two crew members on crashworthy seats. According to AgustaWestland, the AW189 possesses the largest cabin in its class, which is accessed via large sliding doors on either side of the fuselage; a separate externally accessed baggage compartment is also present. The interior is customised to the mission role being undertaken; these include a self-contained emergency medical service (EMS) layout, passenger configurations (with in-flight entertainment systems offered), mission consoles for SAR and law enforcement operations, and an optional dividing wall between the cockpit and main cabin may also be installed. Under certain conditions and limitations, the rotorcraft can be flown by a single pilot. Various pieces of optional equipment can be installed upon the AW189, including fast roping kits, external electric hoist, cargo hook, air conditioning, auxiliary fuel tanks, mission console, emergency flotation system (certified up to Sea State 6), external life rafts, emergency lighting, external search light, main cabin bubble windows, wire strike protection system, de-icing systems providing multiple levels of protection.

== Operational history ==
In July 2013, AgustaWestland reported that they had received over 80 orders and options placed for the AW189. By March 2015, there were roughly 150 orders for the AW189.

On 7 January 2015, AgustaWestland announced that it had concluded a deal to supply 160 AW189s to the Russian oil company Rosneft by 2025. These helicopters will be produced by HeliVert, a joint venture between Finmeccanica-AgustaWestland and Russian Helicopters (a subsidiary of the corporation Rostec). Under the terms of the agreement made in 2015, HeliVert shall be responsible for final assembly of AW189s destined for the Russian and Commonwealth of Independent States (CIS) nations at its Tomilino plant near Moscow, the firm shall also receive an exclusive licence to market and manufacture the AW189 throughout the Russian and CIS market.

In August 2013, UK-based Bristow Helicopters began promoting the AW189 to their offshore clients; Bristow intended to replace their Eurocopter AS332 Super Puma fleet with the AW189. On 21 July 2014, Bristow, who served as the launch customer for the AW189, performed their first commercial flight of the type. Bristow is to procure 11 SAR-configured AW189s as part of an 11-year contract under which Bristow is to take over SAR operations in the United Kingdom from the Royal Navy and Royal Air Force. On 19 January 2015, U.S. helicopter operator AAR Airlift and partner British International Helicopters (BIH) were granted a £180 million ($275 million) 10-year contract, beginning in April 2016, to support UK defence ministry operations in the Falkland Islands. Two AW189s will conduct SAR duties on behalf of British Forces garrisoned at Mount Pleasant Airfield on the South Atlantic islands, replacing RAF Sea Kings that will be retired at the end of March 2016.

In July 2014, Asia-Pacific launch customer Weststar Aviation received its first AW189 in a ceremony at the Farnborough Airshow in Hampshire, England. In November 2014, Middle Eastern launch customer Gulf Helicopters formally launched their first batch of AW189s into operational service. In October 2014, Lease Corporation International (LCI) became the first aircraft lessor to take delivery of the AW189.

After the Beijing Municipal Public Security Bureau ordered two AW189 in November 2021, the Ministry of Transport of the People's Republic of China order six AW189 for its Rescue and Salvage Bureau in March 2022, the six AW189 are expected to be delivered by 2023. At March 2022, there are 73 AW189s in service globally.

In July 2026, Norwegian operator Equinor temporarily withdrew its two AW189 helicopters from regular offshore passenger service after the company's employee safety representatives exercised their statutory right to halt operations due to concerns over cabin noise and reported health complaints from passengers, including tinnitus, headaches, discomfort and fatigue. The helicopters were replaced by AW139s pending further assessment.

== Operators ==
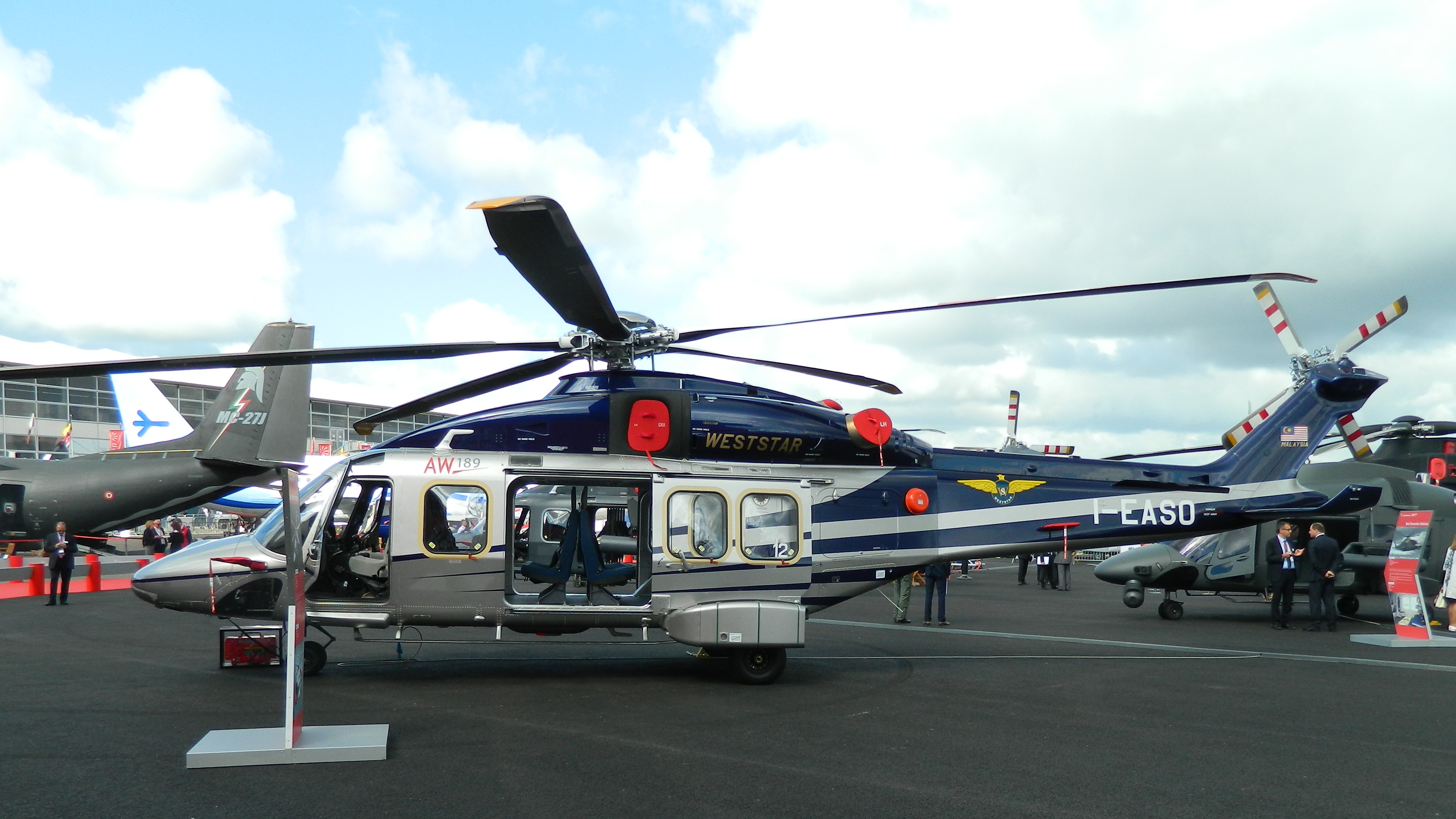
A Weststar Aviation AW189 before delivery on display at 2014 Farnborough Air Show in England

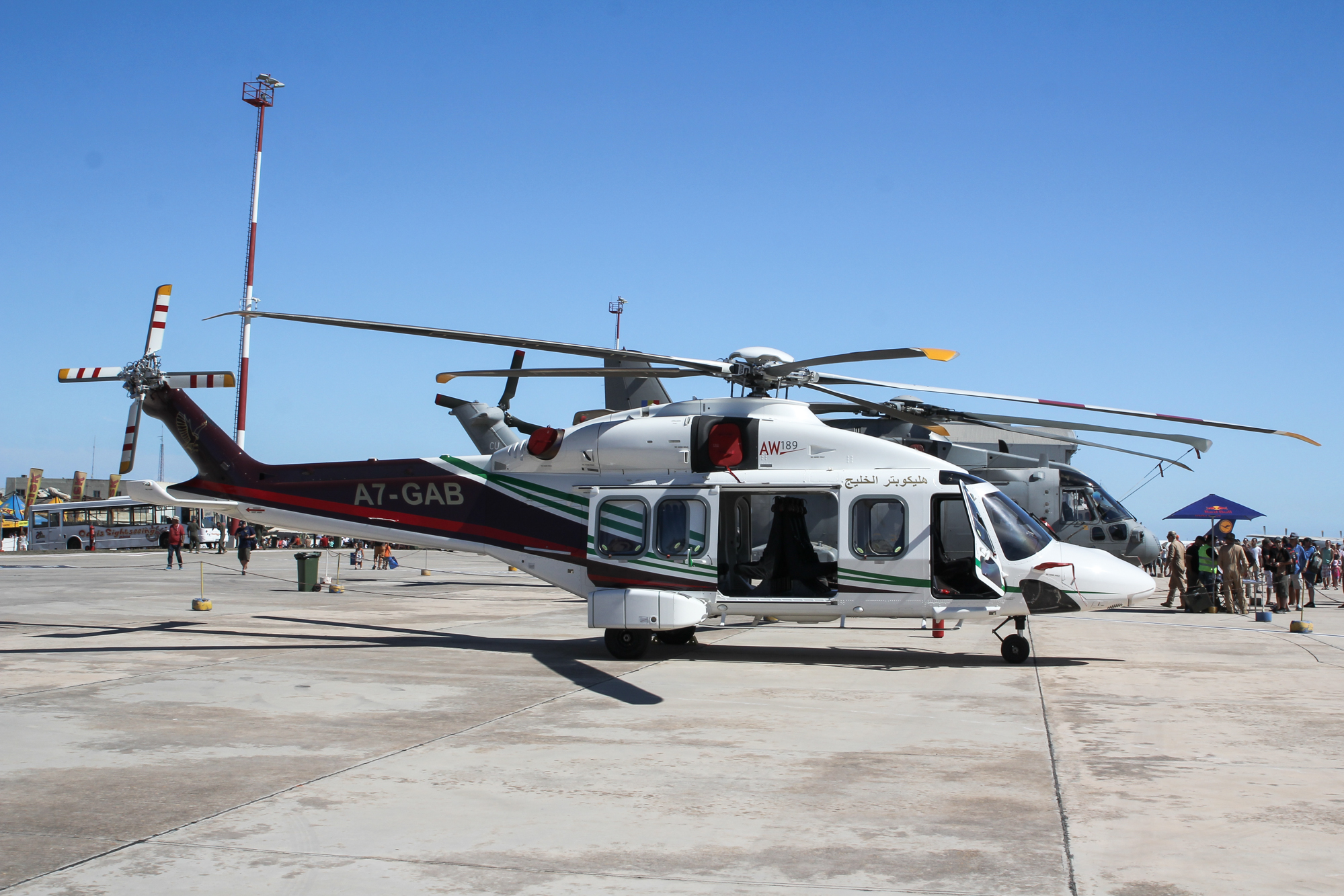
A Gulf Helicopters AW189 before delivery on display at 2015 Malta International Airshow.

=== Military ===
Egypt

- Egyptian Air Force (8 on order)

Indonesia

- Indonesian Air Force (6 on order)

=== Civilian ===
Indonesia

- Indonesian National Police (2 in service. One of them was used as a presidential helicopter starting in May 2025)

Ireland

- Bristow Helicopters (Irish Coast Guard) (6 in service)

Japan

- Tokyo Fire Department (1 on order)

Malaysia

- Weststar Aviation (2 on order)
- Malaysian Fire and Rescue Department
- Malaysian Maritime Enforcement Agency (4 on order)

Netherlands

- Netherlands Coastguard through Bristow

Qatar

- Gulf Helicopters (15 on order)

Russia

- Exxon Neftegas Limited

Republic of Korea

- Seoul Metropolitan Fire and Disaster Management

Thailand

- Royal Thai Police (4 in service)

United Arab Emirates

- Dubai Royal Air Wing (1 on order)

United States

- Milestone Aviation Group (3 on order)

United Kingdom

- Bristow Group (HM Coastguard) (11 in service)

Vietnam

- Southern Vietnam Helicopter Company

== Specifications (AW189) ==
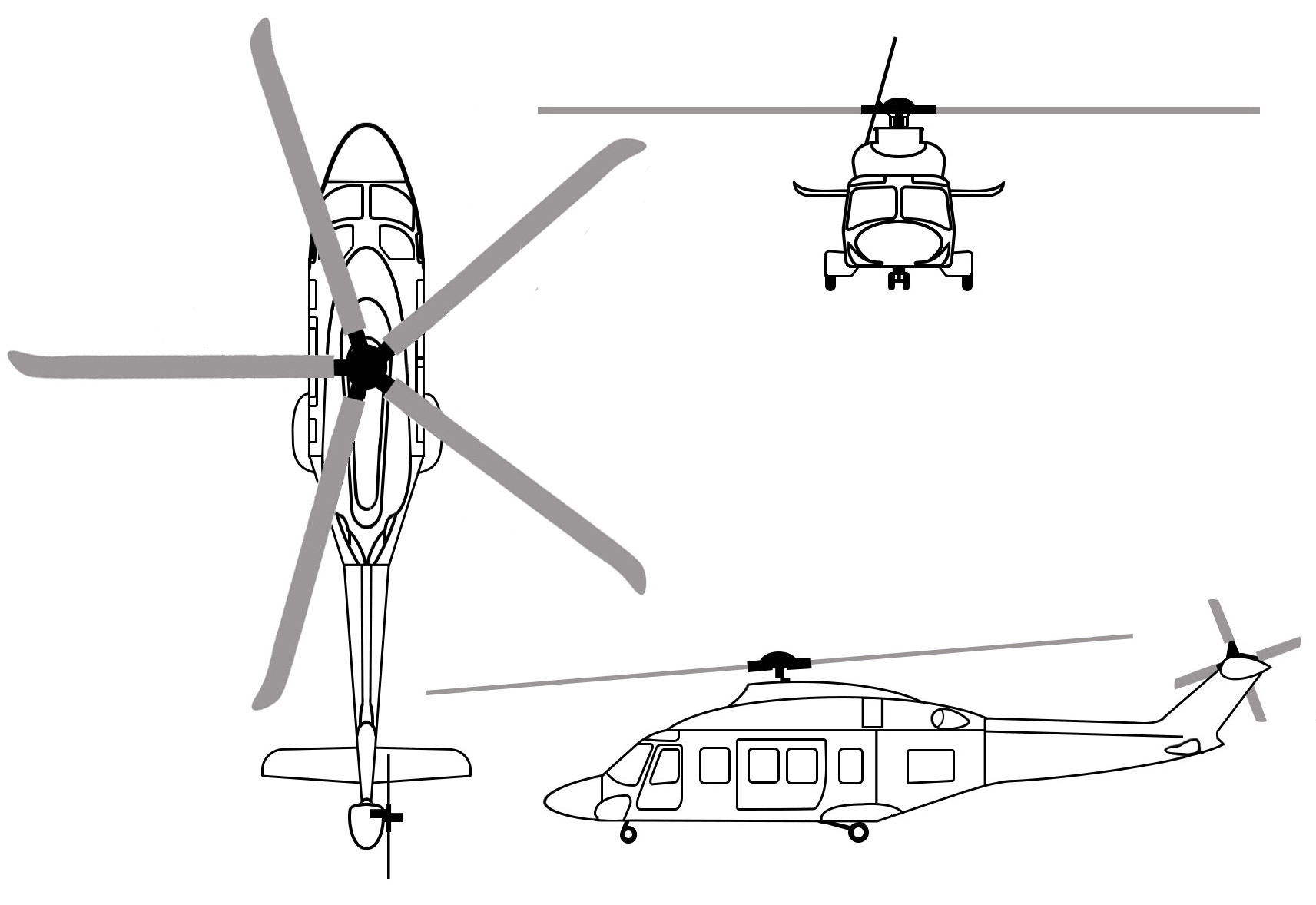
Drawing lines

Data from EASA Type certificate and Yeovil's New Twin

General characteristics

- Crew: 1 or 2
- Capacity: Up to 19 passengers
- Length: 17.60 m (57 ft 9 in)
- Height: 5.06 m (16 ft 7 in)
- Wing area: 53.3 m^{2} (574 sq ft)
- Gross weight: 8,300 kg (18,300 lb)
- Fuel capacity: 2,063 litres (2,569 L with belly tank)
- Powerplant: 2 × General Electric CT7-2E1 turboshaft engine , 1,492 kW (2,000 hp) each
- Main rotor diameter: 14.60 m (47 ft 11 in)

Performance

- Maximum speed: 313 km/h (194 mph, 169 kn)
- Cruise speed: 267–278 km/h (166–173 mph, 144–150 kn)
- Range: 370–907 km (230–490 mi, 200–430 nmi)
- Service ceiling: 3,000 m (10,000 ft)

== See also ==
Related development

- AgustaWestland AW139
- AgustaWestland AW149
- AgustaWestland AW169

Aircraft of comparable role, configuration, and era

- Airbus Helicopters H175
- Bell 525 Relentless
- Kamov Ka-60
- Sikorsky S-92

Related lists

- List of helicopters
