= Syed Azman Syed Ibrahim =

Malaysian business tycoon (born 1960)

Yang Berbahagia Dato' Seri Derma Wangsa Tan Sri Dato' Seri Syed Azman Syed Ibrahim PSM SSDK SSAP SIMP DGMK DIMP
- Born: Syed Azman bin Syed Ibrahim; 23 March 1960 (age 66); Sungai Petani, Kedah, Federation of Malaya (present-day Malaysia)
- Occupations: Founder and chairman of The Weststar Group
- Spouse: Puan Sri Sharifah Aza Syed Adnan

Syed Azman bin Syed Ibrahim (born 23 March 1960) is a Malaysian business tycoon and philanthropist. He is the Group Managing Director of The Weststar Group, a Malaysian conglomerate operating in various industries, including aviation, automotive and defence.

== Early life ==
Syed Azman was born on 23 March 1960 in Sungai Petani, Kedah. He received his early education at Ibrahim Primary School and Ibrahim Secondary School in Sungai Petani before joining the Malaysian Armed Forces (ATM) in 1981. Immediately after successfully completing Cadet Officer training, he was selected to join the KRD and began service in the Defense Intelligence Staff Division (BSPP). His assignment was then more geared towards the duties of a State Military Intelligence Officer (MIO) before completing his service in 1993.

== Career ==
Syed Azman started his business career in 1993 after serving as an officer for 13 years in the Royal Intelligence Corps of the Malaysian Armed Forces. He invested RM200,000 to begin importing used luxury cars from Europe to sell in Malaysia. At that time, he did not have an Approved Permit (AP), an import and export license issued by the Permit Issuing Agencies, instead he only shared with the partners who had the permit. After some time, he managed to have an APs from the government, and his car business became more and more popular.

Then the government decided to abolish the open AP grant and only offer the AP franchise. To get the AP franchise, Syed Azman had to be appointed by a foreign car company as a distributor and then the permit was awarded to him. In 2002, he managed to gain the confidence of Honda to appoint him as a distributor of some of the cars in Malaysia, including Honda Jazz. He got the right to distribute Chevrolet and Suzuki.

During business dealings, he was frustrated with the time spent on the road. That was the time his friend suggested that he purchase a helicopter just to move around. In 2003, he purchased his first helicopter for US$1.5 million for his daily use. When not in use, he rented it out to those who were interested. It was during this time that he realized the demand for a helicopter was high in Malaysia. Five years later, he managed to get the first contract to provide helicopter services to bring oil and gas sector workers to the platform.

Today, Syed Azman is the owner of Weststar Aviation Services Sdn Bhd (WAS), which operates more than 40 helicopters and four private jets. He also holds a contract worth RM8 billion to transport oil rig workers, making him one of the richest Malay men in Malaysia.

== Honours ==
- Malaysia
  - Commander of the Order of Loyalty to the Crown of Malaysia (PSM) – Tan Sri (2009)
- Kedah
  - Knight Commander of the Glorious Order of the Crown of Kedah (DGMK) – Dato' Wira (2006)
  - Knight Grand Companion of the Order of Loyalty to the Royal House of Kedah (SSDK) – Dato' Seri (2021)
  - Dato' Seri Derma Wangsa (2025)
- Pahang
  - Knight Companion of the Order of the Crown of Pahang (DIMP) – Dato' (2000)
  - Grand Knight of the Order of the Crown of Pahang (SIMP) – formerly Dato', now Dato' Indera (2003)
  - Grand Knight of the Order of Sultan Ahmad Shah of Pahang (SSAP) – Dato' Sri (2004)
