= Weststar Aviation =

Malaysian airline

Weststar Aviation Services Sdn Bhd
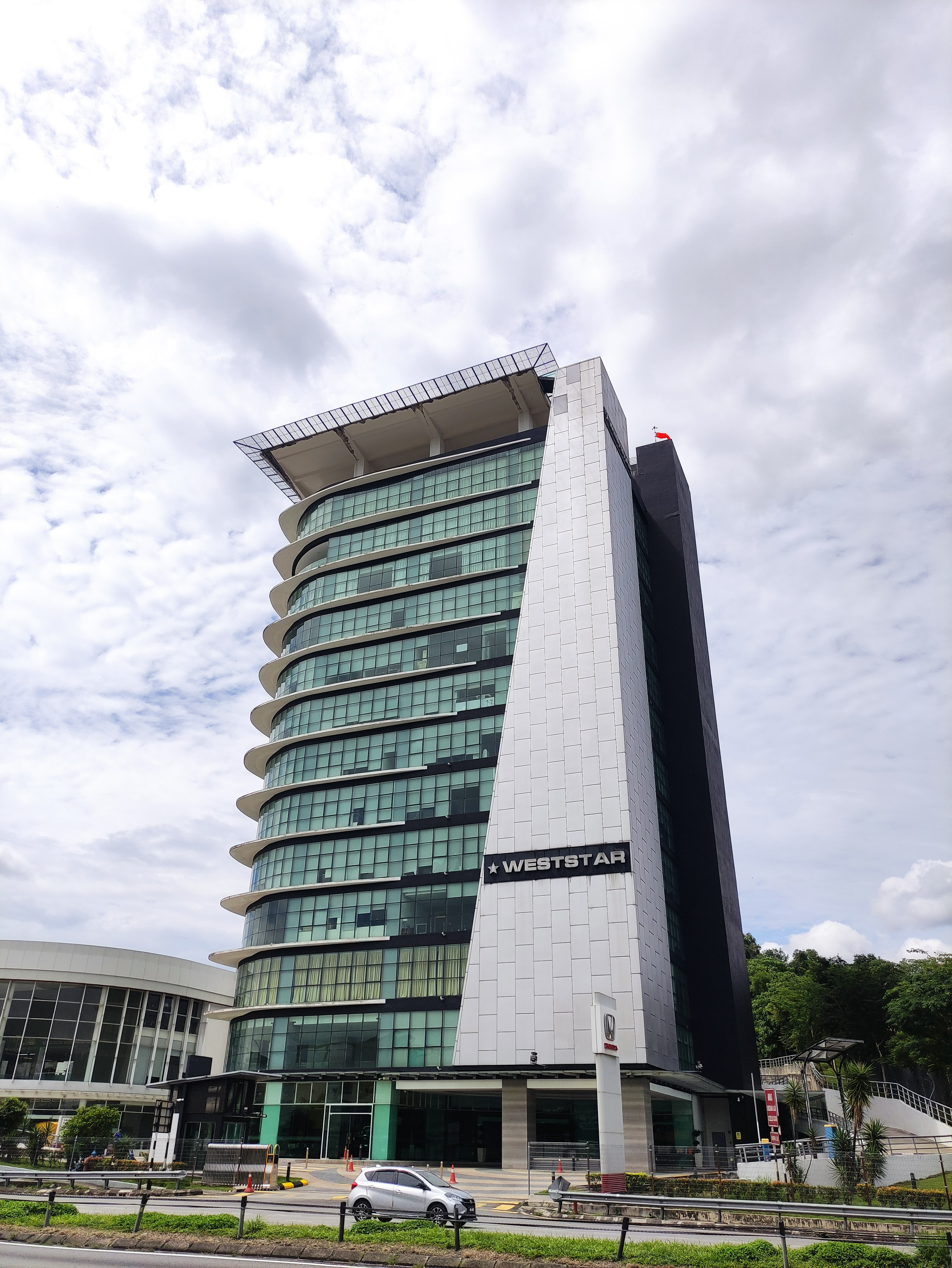
IATA	ICAO	Call sign
-	-	-
- Founded: 2003; 23 years ago
- Hubs: Sultan Abdul Aziz Shah Airport
- Focus cities: Kerteh; Kota Bharu; Kota Kinabalu; Miri
- Parent company: Weststar Group
- Headquarters: Menara Weststar Dataran Weststar, Jalan Lingkaran Tengah II, 68000 Ampang, Selangor Darul Ehsan, Malaysia
- Key people: Tan Sri Syed Azman Syed Ibrahim
- Website: weststar-aviation.aero

Weststar Aviation Services Sdn Bhd (doing business as Weststar Aviation Services) is a Malaysian-based non-scheduled airline company primarily engaged in the transportation of oil & gas personnel. Its main base is located in Sultan Abdul Aziz Shah Airport and has presence in seven other foreign countries. It is a subsidiary of the Malaysian conglomerate company, Weststar Group.

== History ==
It was established in April 2003 upon the approval of the Air Operation Certificate (AOC) by the Malaysian Department of Civil Aviation (DCA). Its primary fleet consists of Airbus Helicopters EC 120 Colibri, EC 135 Ecureuil, AS365 Dauphin and Leonardo AW139. In 2018 they acquired 3 Leonardo AW189 that transports mostly Petronas and Shell personnel in Miri, Sarawak. Weststar offered Petronas to operate the AW189's at a cost similar to operating an AW139 and is currently the cheapest operator of AW189's in the region.

A European subsidiary called Weststar NDD has been founded in 2018 in Italy. A joint venture founded by Namibian Westair Aviation and French Avico Group took the lead of Weststar NDD airline in 2023 and renamed it Westair Helicopters.

== Fleet ==
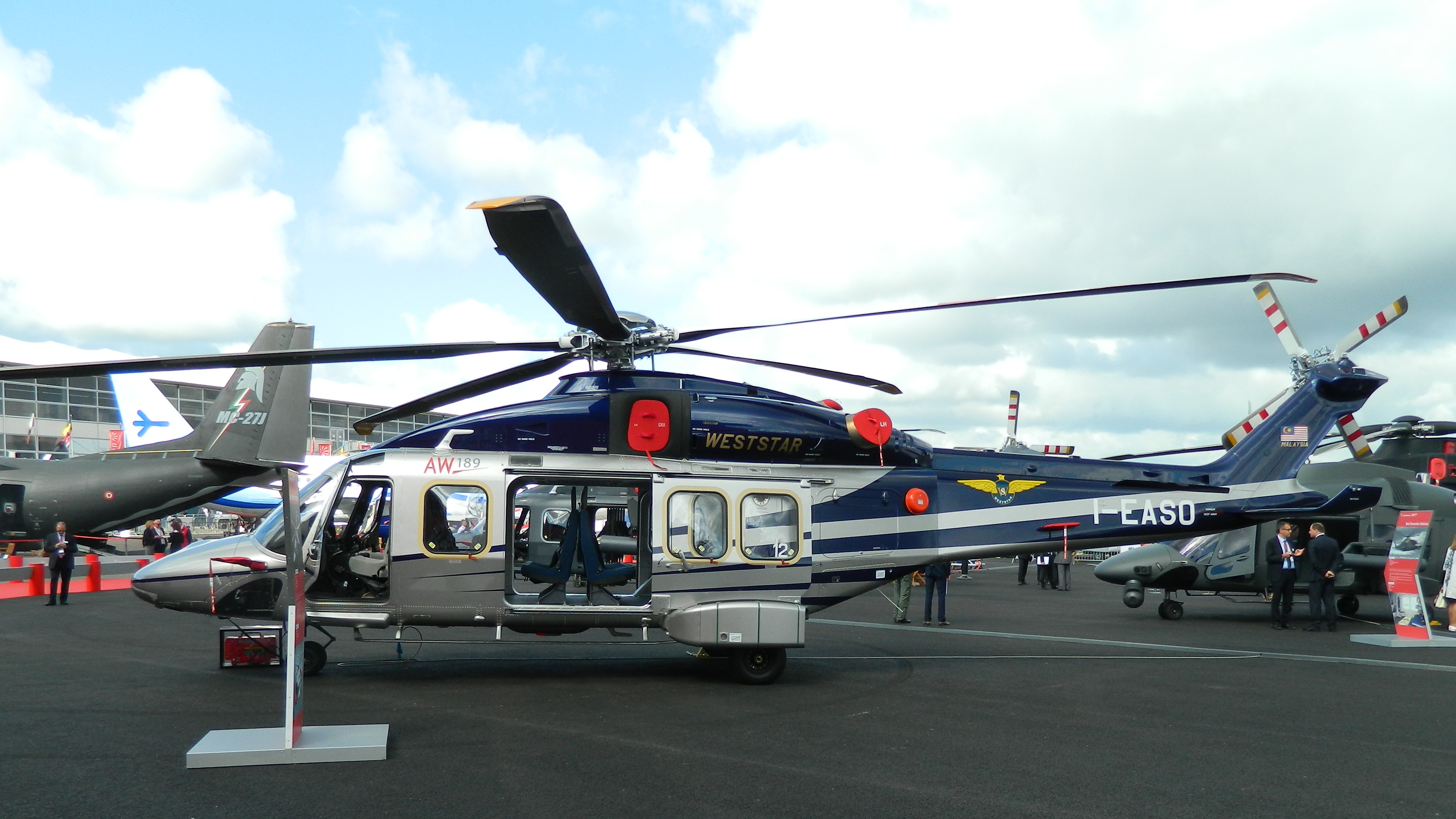
A Weststar AW189 before delivery on display at 2014 Farnborough Air Show in England

The Weststar Aviation Services fleet consists of the following aircraft:

- 1x Eurocopter AS365 Dauphin 2
- 10x Leonardo AW139
- 1x Leonardo AW189
- 1x Boeing 767-200ER (as of July 2026)
