= AgustaWestland AW139 =

Twin-engined, medium-lift helicopter manufactured by Leonardo

AW139
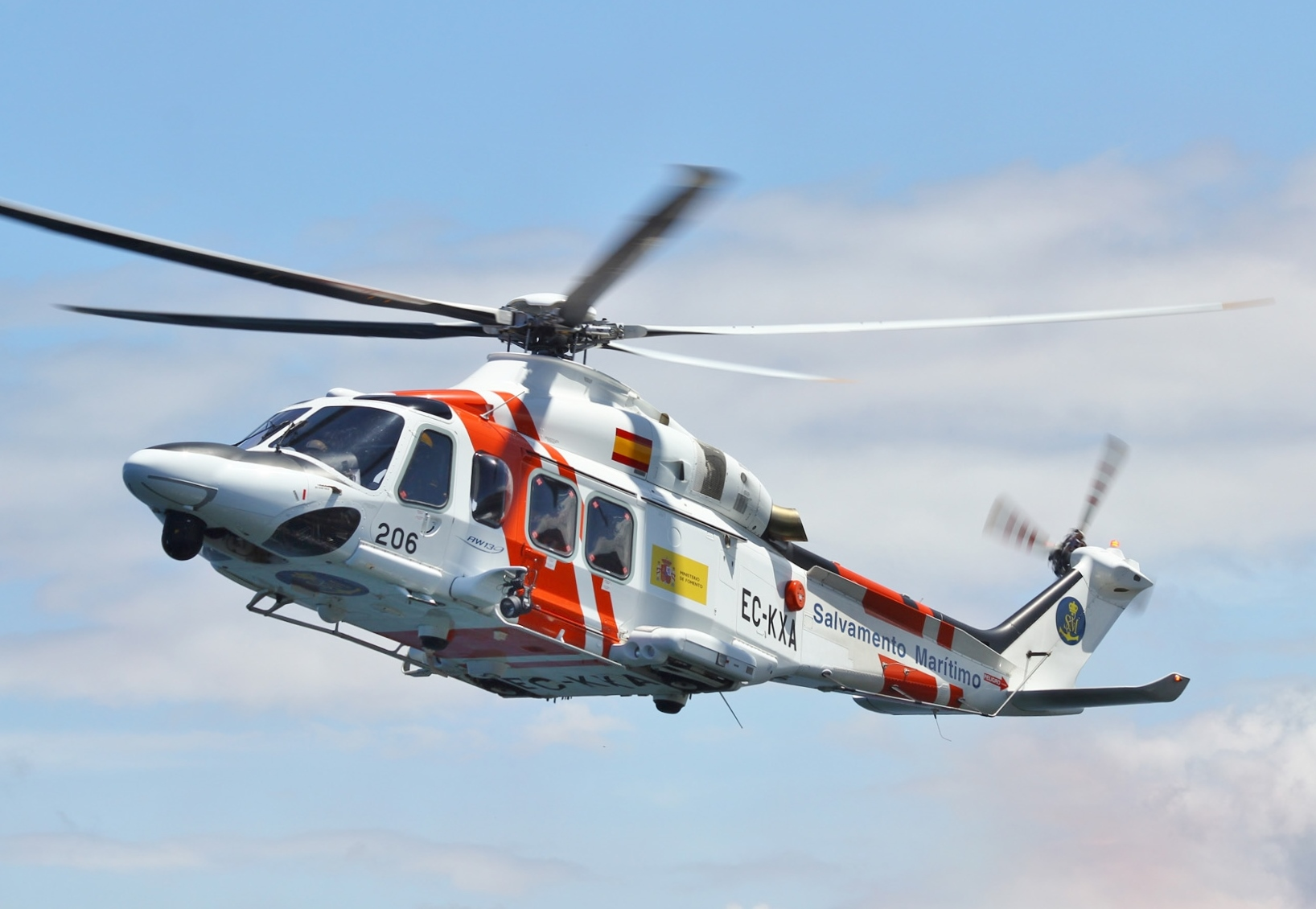
- An AW139 with Spain's Maritime Safety and Rescue agency

General information
- Type: Medium-lift SAR/utility helicopter
- National origin: Italy / UK
- Manufacturer: AgustaWestland; Leonardo
- Status: In production
- Primary users: Italian Air Force CHC Helicopter; Irish Air Corps; United Arab Emirates Air Force
- Number built: 1200+ as of July 2024

History
- Manufactured: 2001–present
- Introduction date: 2003
- First flight: 3 February 2001; 25 years ago
- Variant: Boeing MH-139 Grey Wolf
- Developed into: AgustaWestland AW149

The AgustaWestland AW139, now known as the Leonardo AW139, is a 15-seat medium-sized twin-engined helicopter developed and produced by the Italian helicopter manufacturer AgustaWestland, now part of Leonardo. It is marketed at several different roles, including VIP/corporate transport, military use, offshore transport, firefighting, law enforcement, search and rescue, emergency medical service, disaster relief, and maritime patrol.

The AW139 was designed jointly by the Italian helicopter manufacturer Agusta and the American company Bell Helicopters. It was marketed as the Agusta-Bell AB139, but was redesignated as the AW139 after Bell withdrew from the project. In addition to AgustaWestland's manufacturing facilities in Italy and the United States, other companies are involved in the programme, such as the Polish manufacturer PZL-Świdnik, which has produced hundreds of AW139 airframes, and HeliVert, a joint venture between AgustaWestland and Russian Helicopters, which has established a production line inside Russia for the type. Having performed its maiden flight on 3 February 2001, the AW139 entered revenue service in 2003 and quickly proved itself to be a commercial success.

Many AW139 customers have been in the civilian sector. Large fleets have been obtained by operators such as CHC Helicopter, Gulf Helicopters, and Weststar Aviation. Its performance has made it popular amongst operators supporting the offshore oil and gas industry. A dedicated militarised model, the AW139M, was developed by AgustaWestland. It was first procured by the Italian Air Force. Other military operators include the United States Air Force, which operates the MH-139 Grey Wolf model. The Japanese business Mitsui Bussan Aerospace has obtained an exclusive distribution agreement for the AW139 in Japan. Over 1,200 rotorcraft had been produced by July 2024. The AW139 has been developed into the AW149, an enlarged medium-lift military orientated rotorcraft.

== Development ==
=== Origins ===
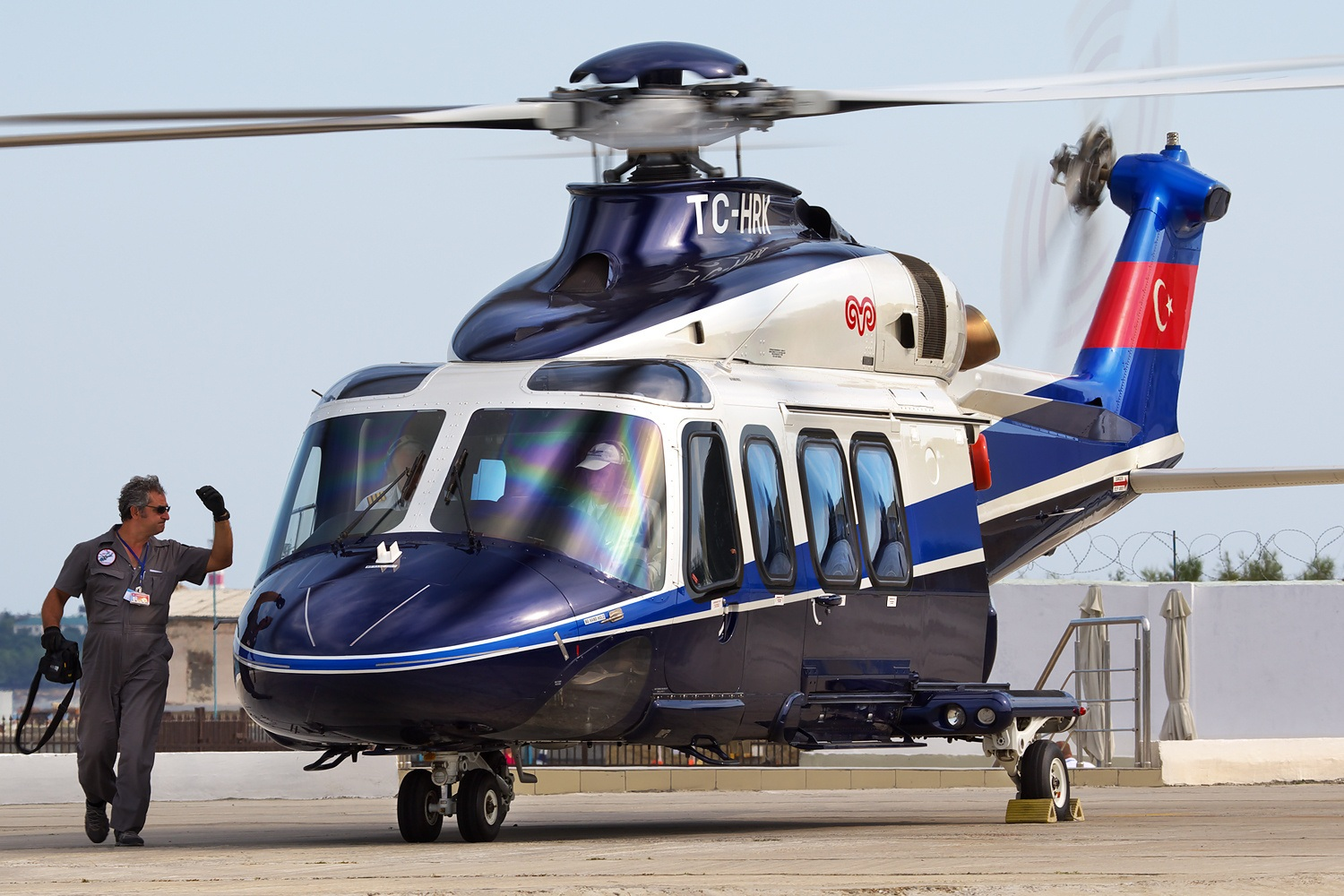
A corporate transport AW139

In 1997, the Italian helicopter manufacturer Agusta launched a programme to develop a replacement for the Bell Huey family of helicopters, which had been built in very large numbers by Bell Helicopter and under license by Agusta. A potential market of 900 aircraft was predicted. In 1998, Bell and Agusta entered into an agreement setting up a joint venture, Bell/Agusta Aerospace Company (BAAC), to develop two aircraft: a conventional helicopter and a tiltrotor aircraft. These became the Bell/Agusta AB139 and Bell/Agusta BA609 respectively. Bell was to be the leading partner for the development of the BA609 while Agusta would be the lead partner for the AB139. It was intended for production, sales, and support to be shared.

In September 2000, the first order was placed by Bristow Helicopters. The first preproduction helicopter flew on 3 February 2001 at Vergiate in Italy, with two further AW139s participating in flying trials. The first production AW139 made its first flight on 24 June 2002. European JAA certification was received in June 2003, and its FAA type certificate followed in December 2004. By May 2005, the AW139 had received in excess of 100 orders worldwide. In the US, the type was marketed under the designation US139, and was entered into the US Army's Light Utility Helicopter competition. A key market for the AW139 was the oil and gas industry, which required helicopters of increased endurance for offshore operations. In 2005, AgustaWestland bought out Bell's 25% share in the program and all of its rights to the AW139 for $95 million.

In April 2008, AgustaWestland revealed that it was in the process of certifying an increase in the AW139's max gross weight to 14,991 lb (6,800 kg), to better compete in long-range markets served by helicopters such as the larger Sikorsky S-92 and Eurocopter EC225. In 2007, a second production line at the United States AgustaWestland Aerospace plant in Philadelphia, Pennsylvania was established. The Philadelphia plant produced its 200th AW139 in September 2014, at which point U.S. production was intended to reach 40 units per year in the near future. By 2011, AgustaWestland was producing 90 AW139s per year. 9.5% of the company's overall revenue in 2010 was attributed to the type. By 2013, a combined total of 720 AW139s had been sold to over 200 operators in 60 countries.

=== Further development ===
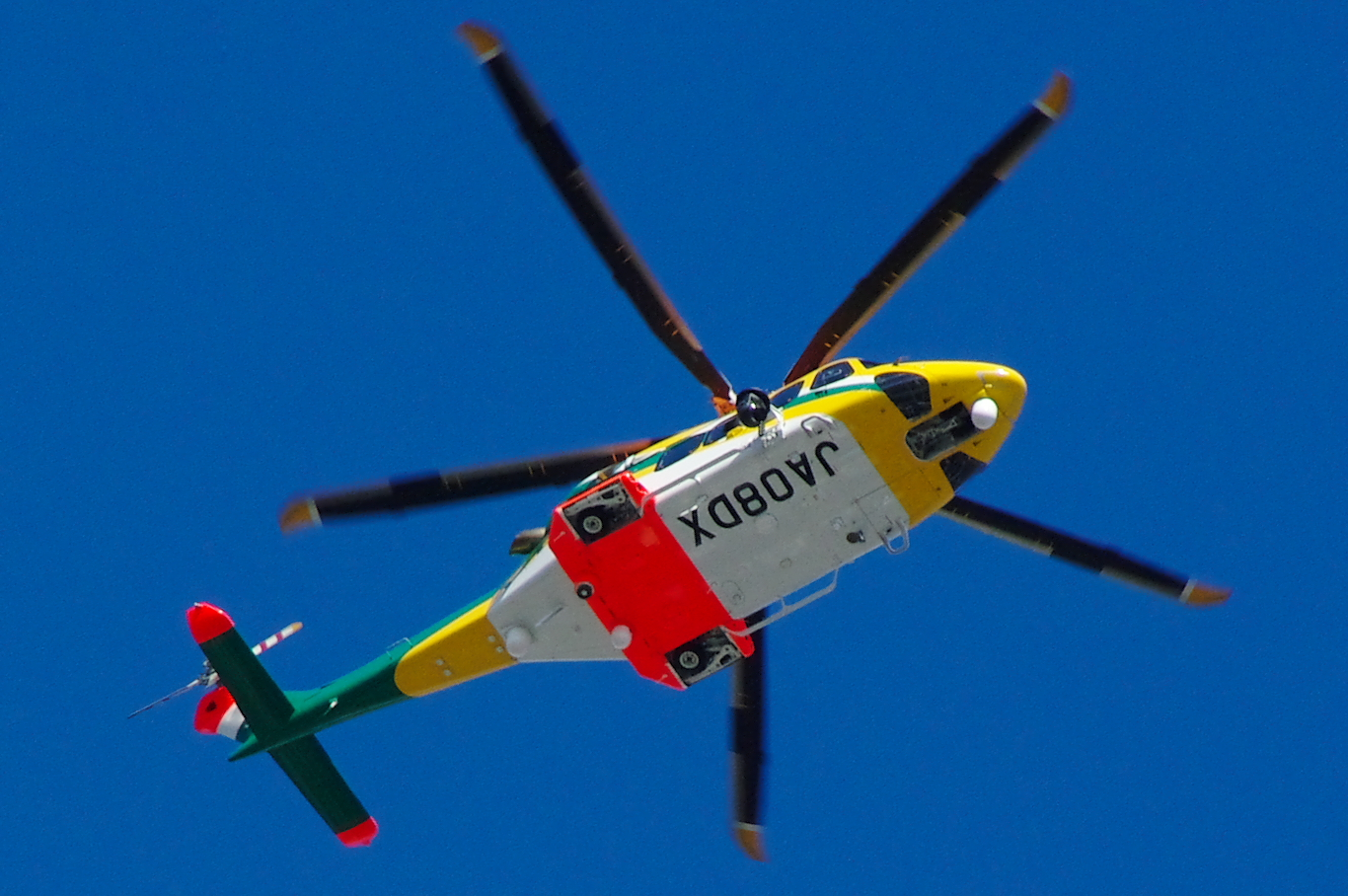
The AW139 has a five-blade main rotor and retractable undercarriage

In 2011, a military-configured variant, the AW139M, was revealed by AgustaWestland. It was promoted at the US market, including for the U.S. Air Force's Common Vertical Lift Support Program. The AW139M is equipped with a high definition forward-looking infrared (FLIR), self-protection system, heavy-duty landing gear, and has low thermal and acoustic signatures. A significant proportion of the equipment is sourced from American manufacturers. Options offered include an external stores system including various armaments, armoured seats, self-sealing fuel tanks, and a full ice protection system for all-weather operations.

The AW139 serves as the basis for AgustaWestland's wider business strategy, under which it aims to produce a standardised family of helicopters with common design features. The sharing of components and design philosophies is intended to simplify maintenance and training for operators. Commonality also lowers the production costs. The AW139 was the first of this group, and as of 2014, it was to be joined by the larger AW149 and AW189, aimed at military and civilian customers respectively. Advances made in the development of new models are intended to be transferable onto existing family members, decreasing the cost of future upgrades for the AW139.

In June 2010, it was announced that AgustaWestland and Rostvertol would build a manufacturing plant in Tomilino, Moscow Region, where it was initially planned to produce AW139s by 2012. HeliVert, a joint venture between AgustaWestland and Rostvertol, began domestic production of the AW139 in 2012, at which point it was planned that between 15 and 20 helicopters would be produced per year. The first AW139 to be assembled in Russia made its first flight in December 2012. In January 2013, the Russian Defense Ministry was reportedly considering placing an order for seven AW139s. In January 2014, HeliVert received a Certificate of Approval from the Aviation Register of the Interstate Aviation Committee to begin production of commercial AW139s. In September 2014, a certificate was granted to perform comprehensive maintenance and servicing of the type at the Tomilino facility.

During 2015, AgustaWestland unveiled an AW139 model with an increased gross weight of seven tonnes, enabling a range of 305 km while carrying 12 passengers. Existing AW139s can be rebuilt to the newer heavy-weight model. This heavier airframe comes at the expense of decreased hot and high performance. In November 2015, AgustaWestland demonstrated a 60-minute "run-dry" test (no oil) of an AW139's main gearbox, 30 minutes greater than any other certified rotorcraft at the time.

== Design ==
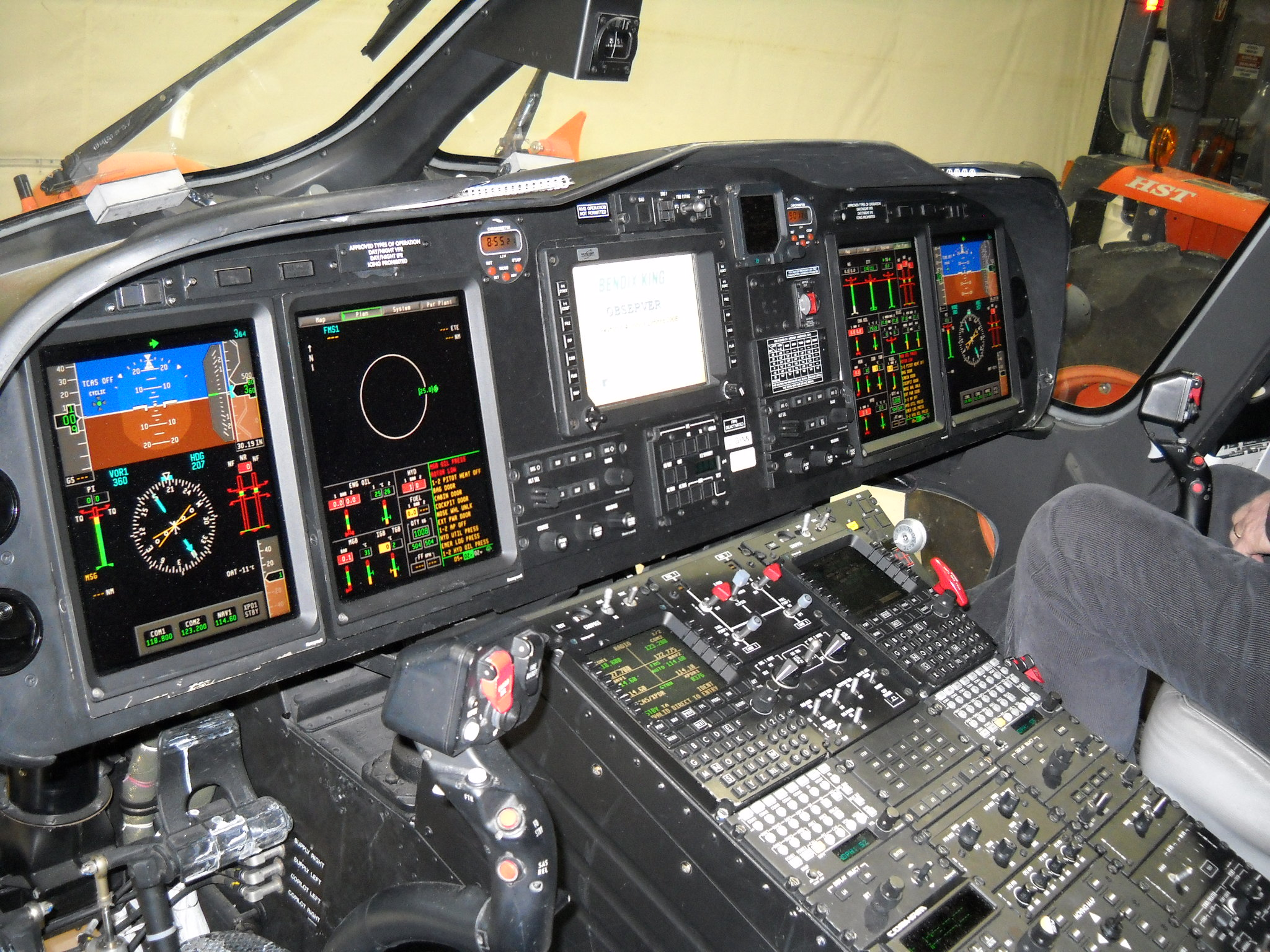
Instrument panel of the AW139

The AW139 is a conventional twin-engine multi-role helicopter. It has a five-bladed fully articulated main rotor with a titanium hub and composite blades and a four-bladed articulated tail rotor. It is fitted with retractable tricycle landing gear, the two aft wheels retracting into external sponsons which are also used to house emergency equipment. It is flown by a crew of two pilots, with up to 15 passengers accommodated in three rows of five. The AW139 had been aimed at a vacant niche in the market, sitting below larger types such as the Eurocopter AS332 Super Puma and Sikorsky S-92, and above smaller ones like the Bell 412 and Eurocopter EC155. Rotor & Wing has described the AW139's flying attitude as 'docile and predictable'.

The AW139 is powered by two FADEC-controlled Pratt & Whitney Canada PT6C turboshaft engines. The FADEC system seamlessly adjusts the engines for pilot convenience and passenger comfort, and can automatically handle a single-engine failure without noticeable deviation. It was constructed with maintenance requirements in mind. Critical systems can be readily accessed, where possible the number of parts has been reduced, and many components have been designed for an extended lifecycle. A Health and Usage Monitoring System (HUMS) is equipped. More than a thousand customizable items of equipment can be configured per customer demand, including auxiliary fuel tanks, rescue hoists, cargo hooks, search and weather radar, ice protection systems, external cameras and searchlights, and seating arrangements.

The AW139 cockpit is based on the modular Honeywell Primus EPIC avionics system incorporating a four LCD screen glass cockpit. Although an option on early models, most aircraft include a four-axis autopilot, which allows higher levels of automation and safety and enables advanced functions such as auto-hover. This level of automation has allowed certification for single-pilot operations under instrument flight rules conditions (SPIFR), and the cockpit can optionally be modified for compatibility with night vision goggles. The latest version of the Primus EPIC avionics systems includes a synthetic vision system. Pilot training for the type is available via advanced Level D Full Flight Simulators. The AW139 has "the largest cabin in its class", containing up to 15 passengers or four litters and accompanying medics. An additional baggage compartment is used to stow equipment to keep the main cabin clear for use.

Large sections of the AW139 have been developed and produced by a range of different companies. Airframes are typically produced by PZL-Świdnik, who delivered their 200th airframe in April 2014. Pratt & Whitney Canada produce the type's PT6C turboshaft engines. The primary and secondary transmissions were developed by Westland GKN and Kawasaki Heavy Industries respectively. A significant portion of the avionics are sourced from Honeywell. Turkish Aerospace Industries has been subcontracted to manufacture various elements of the AW139, including the fuselage, canopy, and radome. Final assembly of most AW139s is performed at AgustaWestland's facilities in Philadelphia, United States, and Vergiate, Italy. Those destined for customers within the Commonwealth of Independent States are typically assembled by a third final manufacturing plant in Tomilino, Moscow operated by HeliVert.

== Operational history ==
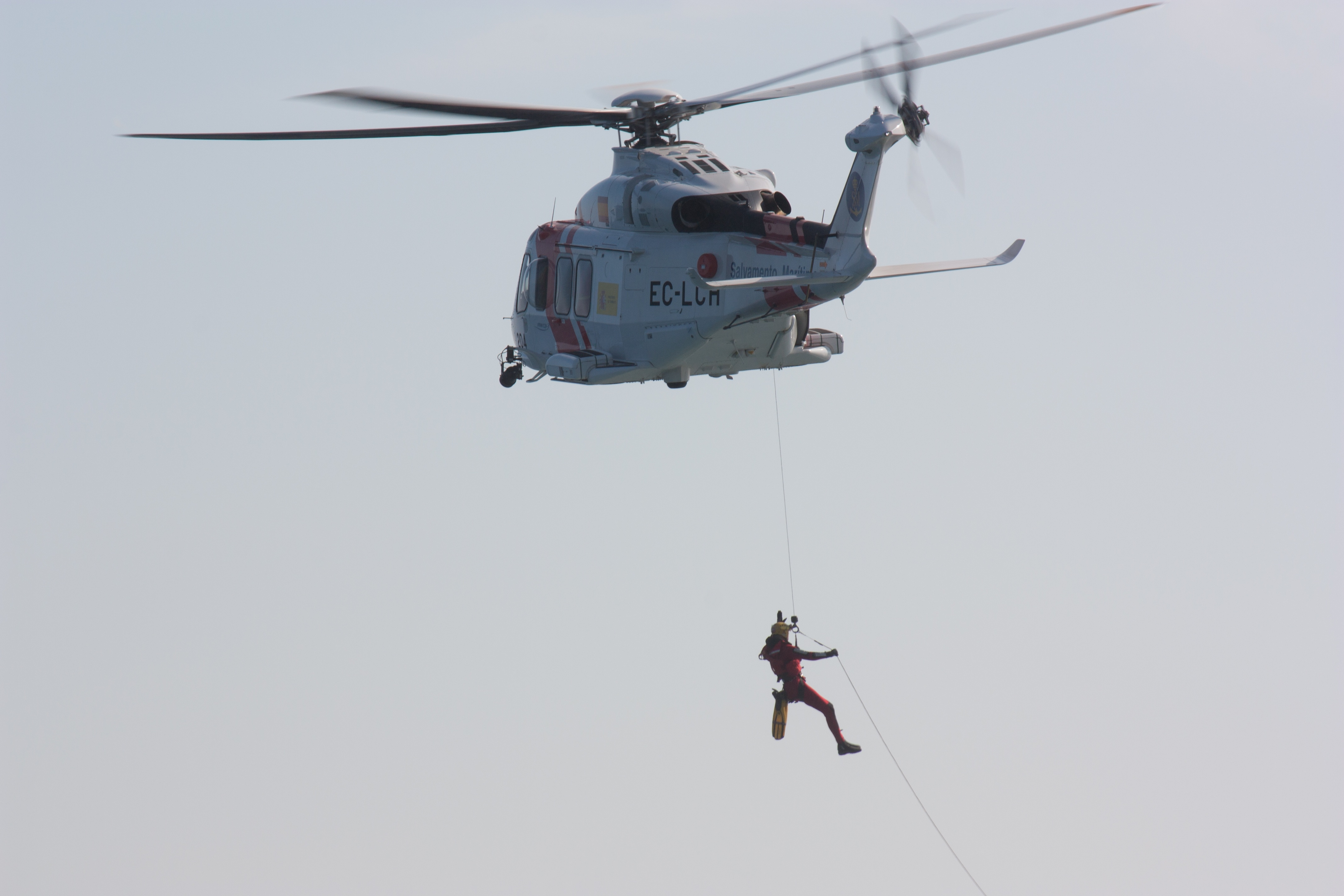
A SASEMAR AW139 during a helihoisting exercise

The Irish Air Corps was the first military operator to introduce the AW139. It took delivery of the first of a batch of six rotorcraft during August 2006. The United Arab Emirates Air Force and the Qatar Air Force became the second and third military operators of the AW139, procuring 9 and 18 rotorcraft respectively. A specialised military variant, the AW139M, was launched, for which the Italian Air Force became the launch customer. Designated HH-139A in Italian service, the type has been primarily tasked with combat search and rescue (CSAR) operations. The Italian Coast Guard placed repeat orders for the type throughout the 2010s, ordering 12 AW139s by mid-2016.

In February 2006, Mitsui Bussan Aerospace signed a $100 million contract for 12 AW139s and an exclusive distribution agreement for the AW139 in Japan. In October 2006, the Japan Coast Guard announced the AW139 as the replacement for its Bell 212 search and rescue fleet. By early 2011, 18 AW139s were on order by the Japan Coast Guard through Mitsui Bussan as the distributor. A total of 24 are expected to be ordered.

The Japanese National Police Agency placed multiple orders for the AW139. Other organisations in Japan have used the type for electronic news gathering, firefighting, disaster relief operations. In 2016, Leonardo announced that the 50th AW139 to the Japanese market had been delivered. In March 2017, the delivery of the first Japanese VIP-configured AW139 took place to an undisclosed customer.

In the North American market, CHC Helicopter was the first operator of the type. In 2012, CHC became the largest operator of the AW139 in the world, at that point operating a fleet of 44 in search and rescue, emergency medical service and offshore transport missions. In 2015, responsibility for the maintenance of CHC's AW139 fleet was reorganized under their maintenance, repair and overhaul services (MRO) division, Heli-One. Early activities have included post-delivery modifications and engine overhauls. Heli-One has endeavoured to expand the scope of its MRO in coordination with Leonardo Helicopters, becoming an authorized component repair center by the company, and become approved to perform main gearbox work in April 2021.

In October 2012, the Royal Thai Army ordered a pair of AW139s. A further eight were produced in October 2015. In September 2021, the privately owned company Thai Aviation Services arranged the delivery of three AW139s to undertake a multi-year contract to support oil and gas extraction activities in Malaysia. In 2021, following the retirement of the Royal Malaysian Air Force's Sikorsky S-61 fleet, the service leased four AW139s as an interim replacement.

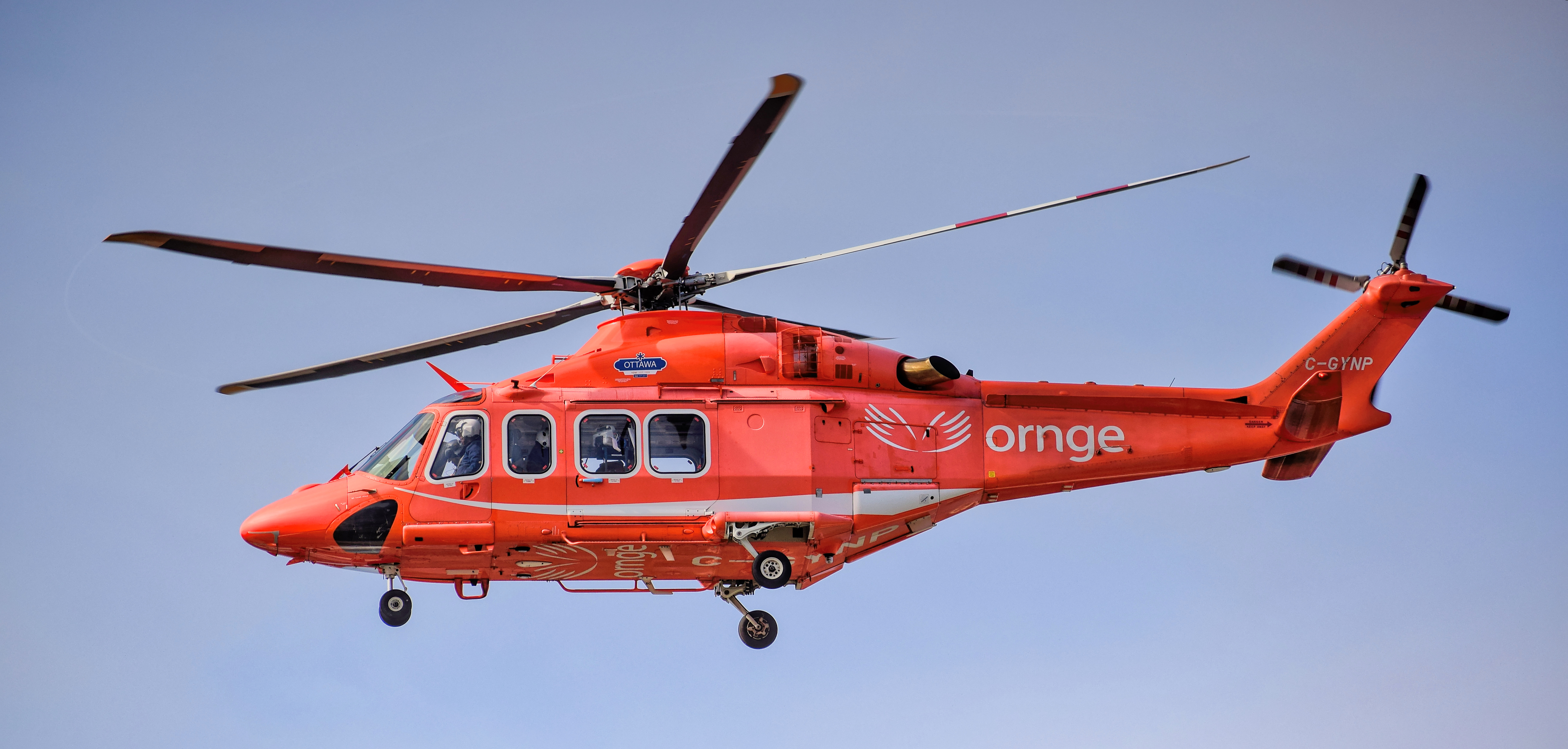
An Ornge AW139 air ambulance

Qatar-based firm Gulf Helicopters has become one of the largest AW139 operators worldwide, first ordering the type in 2007 for offshore transport duties. It has since become an authorized service center and training center for the AW139. Malaysian operator Weststar Aviation is the biggest operator of the AW139 in the Asia Pacific region. By February 2014, the company had ordered 34 helicopters. Since taking delivery of their first AW139 in December 2010, Weststar has typically employed the type in support of offshore oil and gas operations.

Numerous AW139s have been produced for operators in Russia, mainly via the HeliVert initiative. In September 2014, Exclases Russia ordered three in VIP configurations. During December 2021, it was announced that HeliVert had supplied four AW139s to the Russian state-owned defense conglomerate Rostec. In March 2022, shortly following the Russian invasion of Ukraine, Leonardo Helicopters suspended its business in Russia and restricted the support available to existing operators of the type in the country.

In July 2014, AgustaWestland announced that the global fleet had accumulated in excess of one million flight hours. By this milestone, a total of 770 AW139s had been produced.

In May 2016, AgustaWestland parent Leonardo-Finmeccanica announced that Pakistan had signed a contract for an undisclosed number of AW139s as part of a fleet renewal programme spread over several batches, including a logistic support and training package, to perform search and rescue (SAR) operations across the country. At the time of the announcement, a total of 11 AW139s were already in service in Pakistan, five of which were being operated for government relief and general transportation duties.

Chinese operators have imported the type. By February 2010, two AW139s had been ordered by both the Beijing Municipal Public Security Bureau and the Shenzhen Public Security Bureau for law enforcement, disaster relief, and general transportation duties. In July 2022, it was stated that 40 AW139s had been delivered by Leonardo Helicopters to China. The largest civil helicopter operator in China, CITIC Offshore Helicopter, operates eight AW139s.

In September 2018, the United States Air Force (USAF) announced that the MH-139, an AW139 variant, was the winner of a competition to replace the Vietnam-era Bell UH-1Ns. The service will buy up to 84 MH-139s. On 19 December 2019, the USAF received the first MH-139A Grey Wolf at Eglin Air Force Base. Flight testing began in 2020. Several rectifiable deficiencies were identified, such as the positioning of the gunner in the cabin fulfilling the specified requirements yet not satisfying reviewing USAF officials. Alternative cabin configurations have been discussed. In early March 2023, the USAF gave a positive Milestone C decision and issued a $285 million LRIP contract for the first 13 MH-139s. Low-rate production began days later.

== Variants ==
AB139
Original Italian-built production aircraft, 54 built.
AW139
Designation change from 55th aircraft onwards, built in Italy.
AW139 (long nose configuration)
Long nose variant with increased room for avionics built in Italy and the United States.
AW139M
Militarised variant, capable of carrying various weapons payloads.
HH-139A
Italian Air Force designation for ten search-and rescue configured AW139Ms.
VH-139A
Italian Air Force designation for two VIP configured AW139s.
HH-139B
Italian Air Force designation for newer AW139.
UH-139C
Italian State Police designation.
UH-139D
Italian Carabinieri designation.
PH-139D
Italian Guardia di Finanza designation.
UH-139E
Italian State Police designation.
US139
Military variant, was the AgustaWestland proposed entry for the US Army Light Utility Helicopter programme in partnership with L-3 Communications.
MH-139A Grey Wolf
Military variant from Boeing in partnership with Leonardo. It was selected by the United States Air Force to replace its UH-1N fleet. The USAF accepted its first MH-139 in December 2019 and named it "Grey Wolf".
AW139W
A variant offered to the Polish Armed Forces.

== Operators ==
=== Military ===
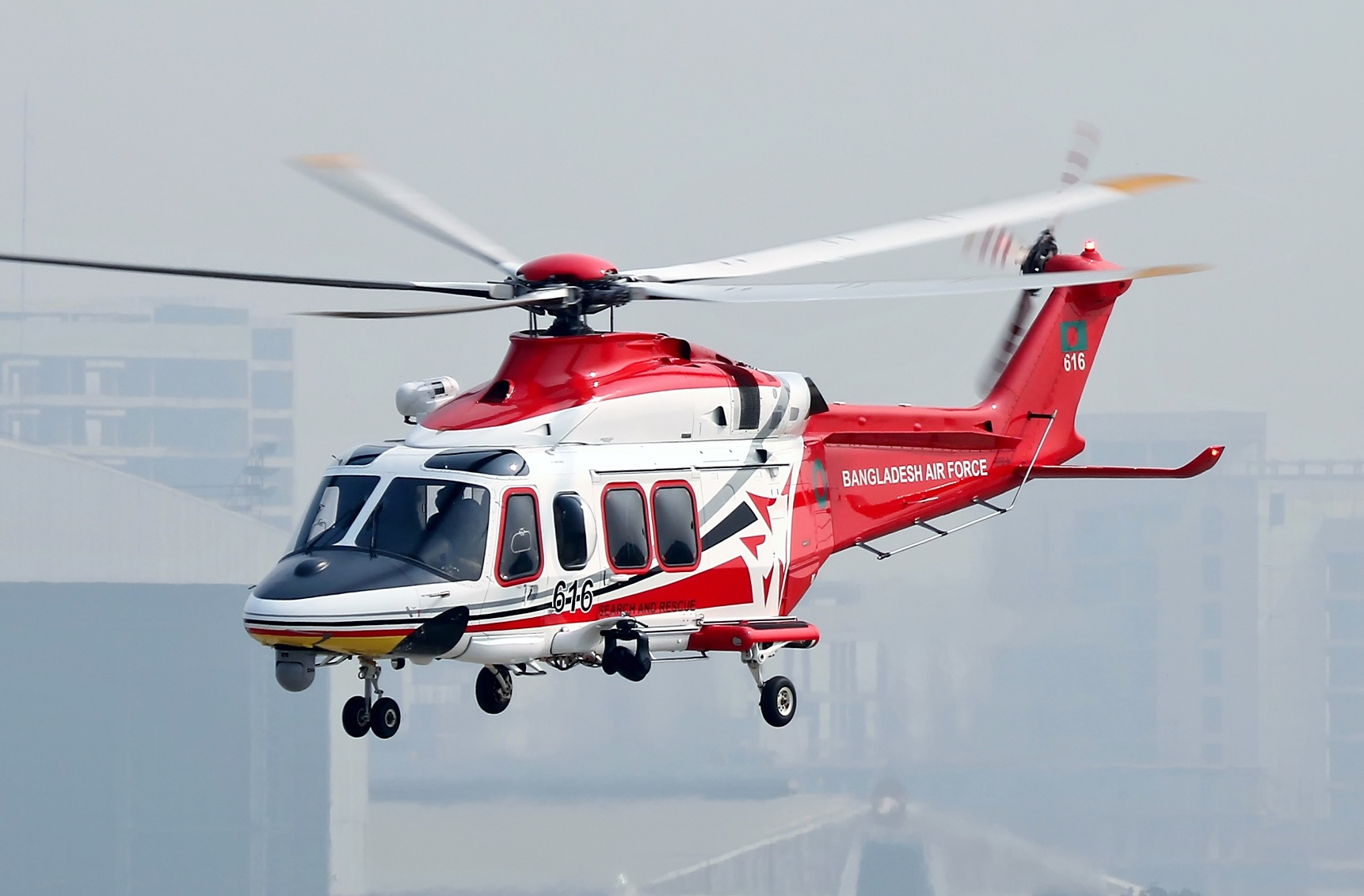
AW139 helicopter of Bangladesh Air Force

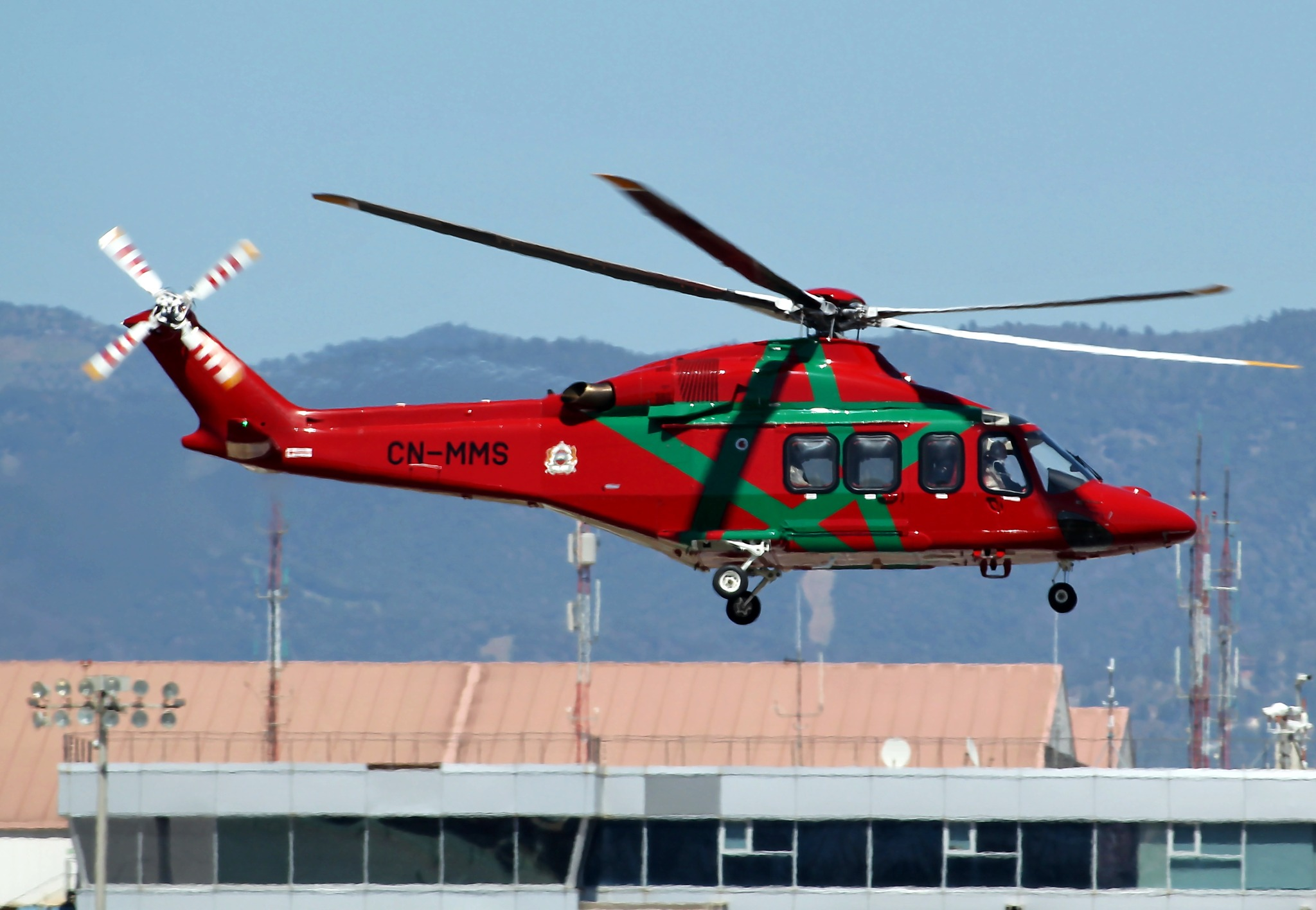
AW139 from Royal Moroccan Air Force VIP Transport Fleet

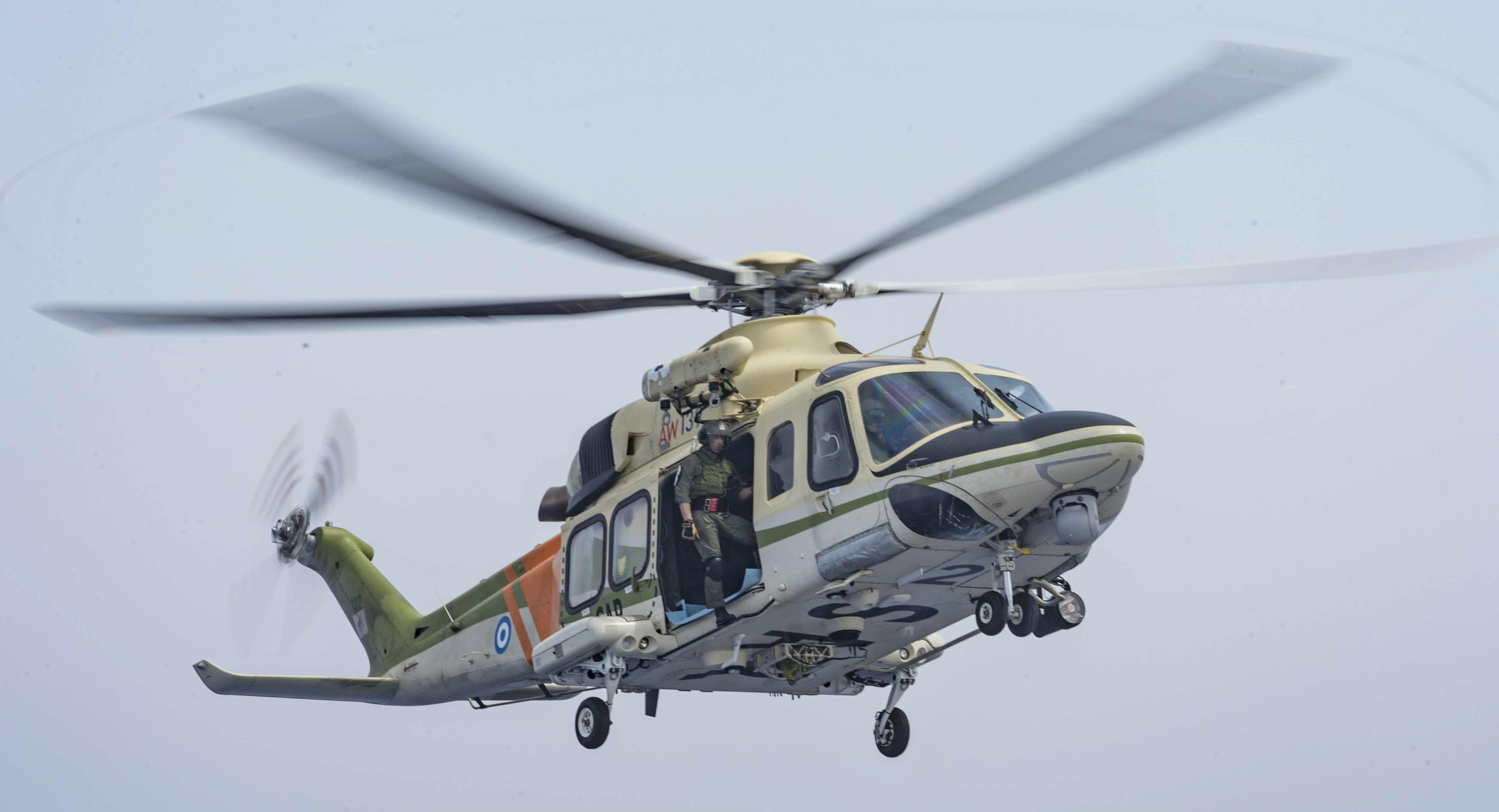
Cypriot AW139 departs the USS Stout

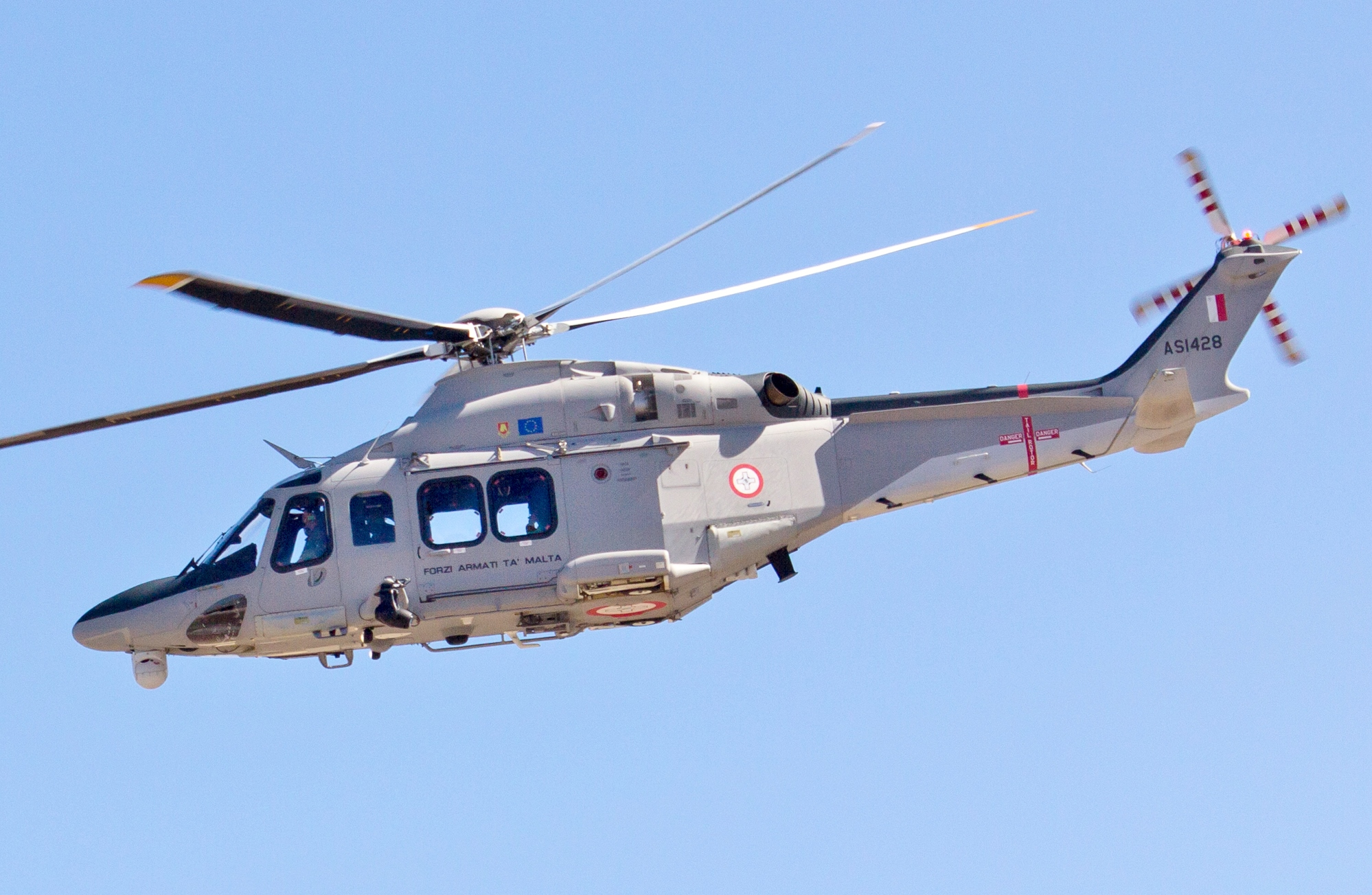
A Maltese Air Wing AW139

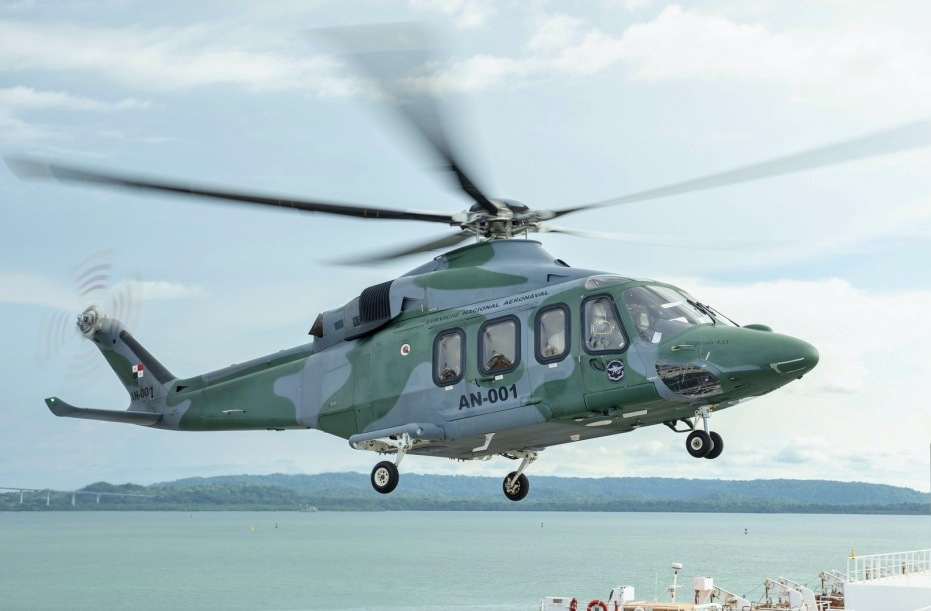
An AW139 helicopter landing on the USNS Comfort

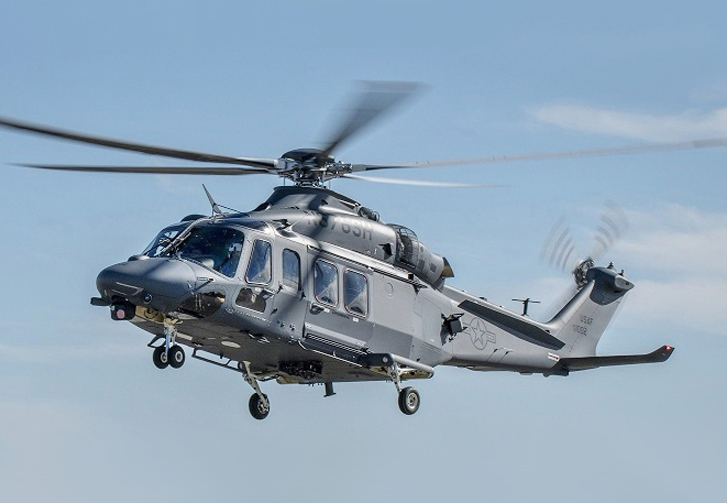
An MH-139 of the U.S. Air Force

Algeria

- Algerian Air Force
- Algerian Navy

Angola

- National Air Force of Angola

Australia

- Australian Army

Bangladesh

- Bangladesh Air Force

Colombia

- Colombian Air Force

Cyprus

- Cyprus Air Force

Egypt

- Egyptian Air Force

Ivory Coast

- Ivory Coast Air Force

Ireland

- Irish Air Corps

Italy

- Italian Air Force
- Guardia di Finanza
- Guardia Costiera

Kenya

- Kenya Air Force

Lebanon

- Lebanese Air Force

Libya

- Libyan Air Force

Malaysia

- Royal Malaysian Navy Aviation
- Royal Malaysian Air Force

Malta

- Maltese Air Wing

Nepal

- Nepalese Army Air Service (2)

Nigeria

- Nigerian Air Force
- Nigerian Navy

Pakistan

- Pakistan Air Force
- Pakistan Army

Panama

- Aeronaval Service of Panama

Qatar

- Qatar Emiri Air Force

Slovenia

- Slovenian Air Force and Air Defence

Thailand

- Royal Thai Army

Trinidad and Tobago

- Trinidad & Tobago Air Guard

Turkmenistan

- Turkmen Air Force

United Arab Emirates

- UAE Air Force

=== Civilian ===
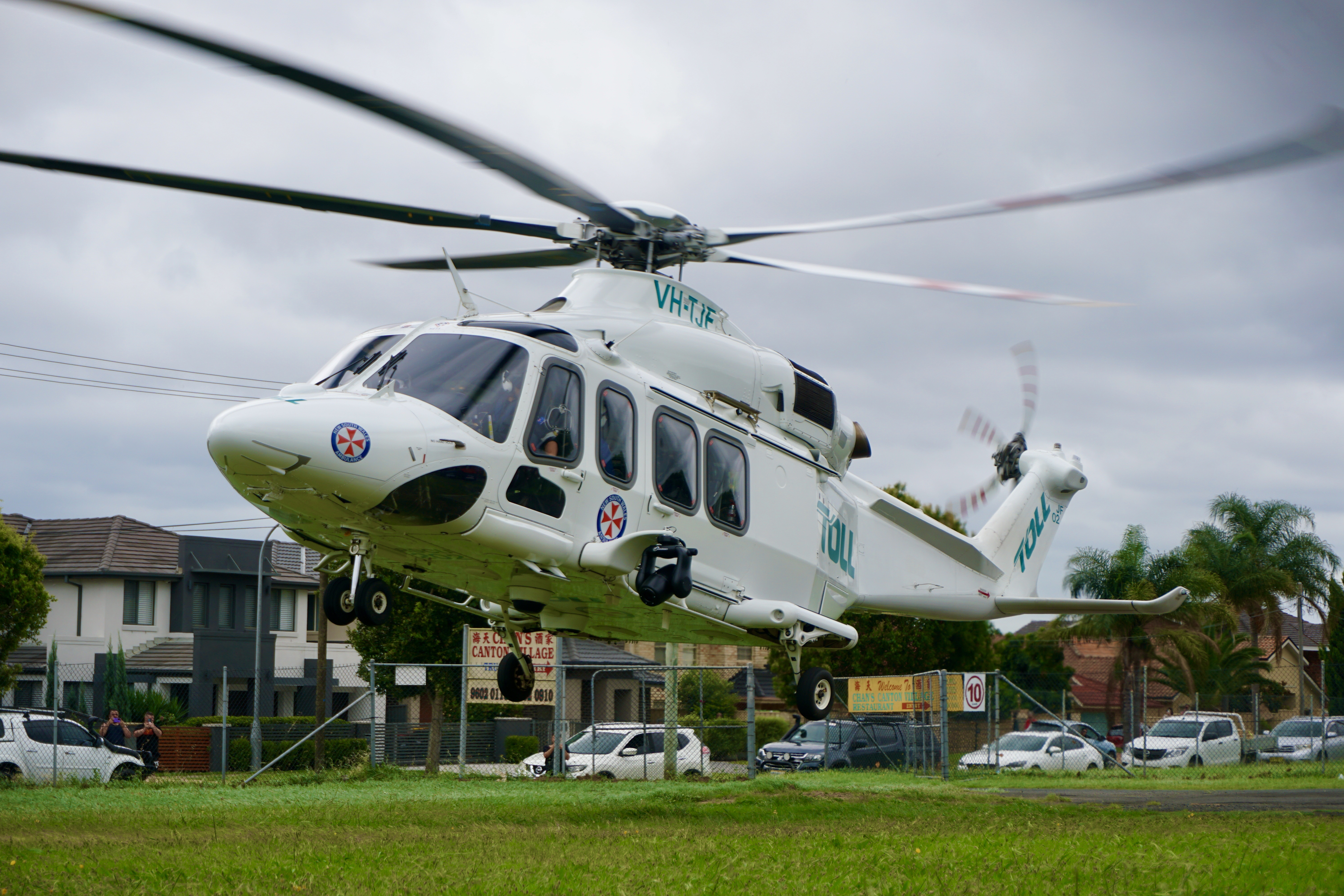
Medical retrieval AW139 operated by Ambulance NSW

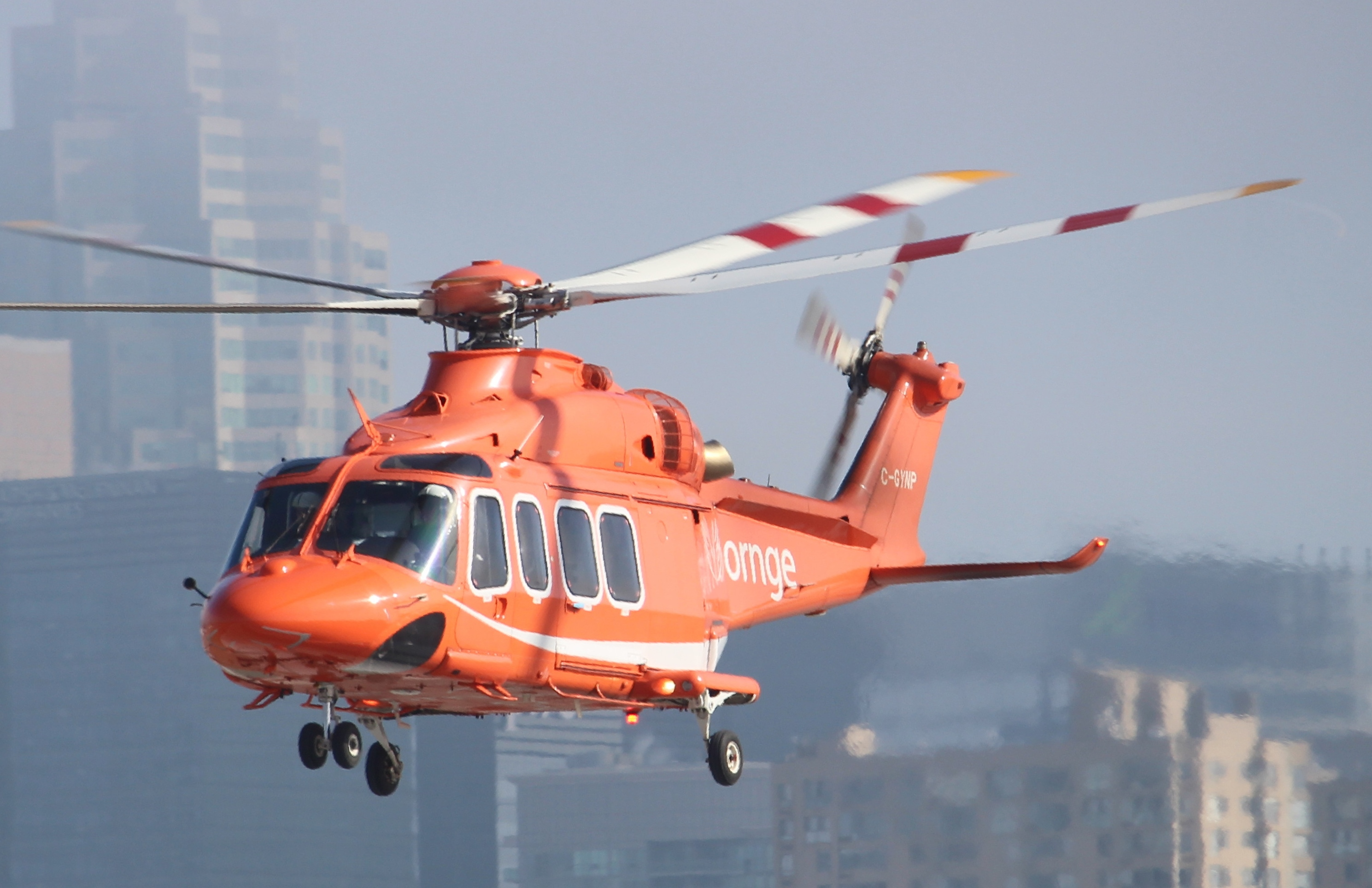
Ornge's AW139 landing at Billy Bishop Airport

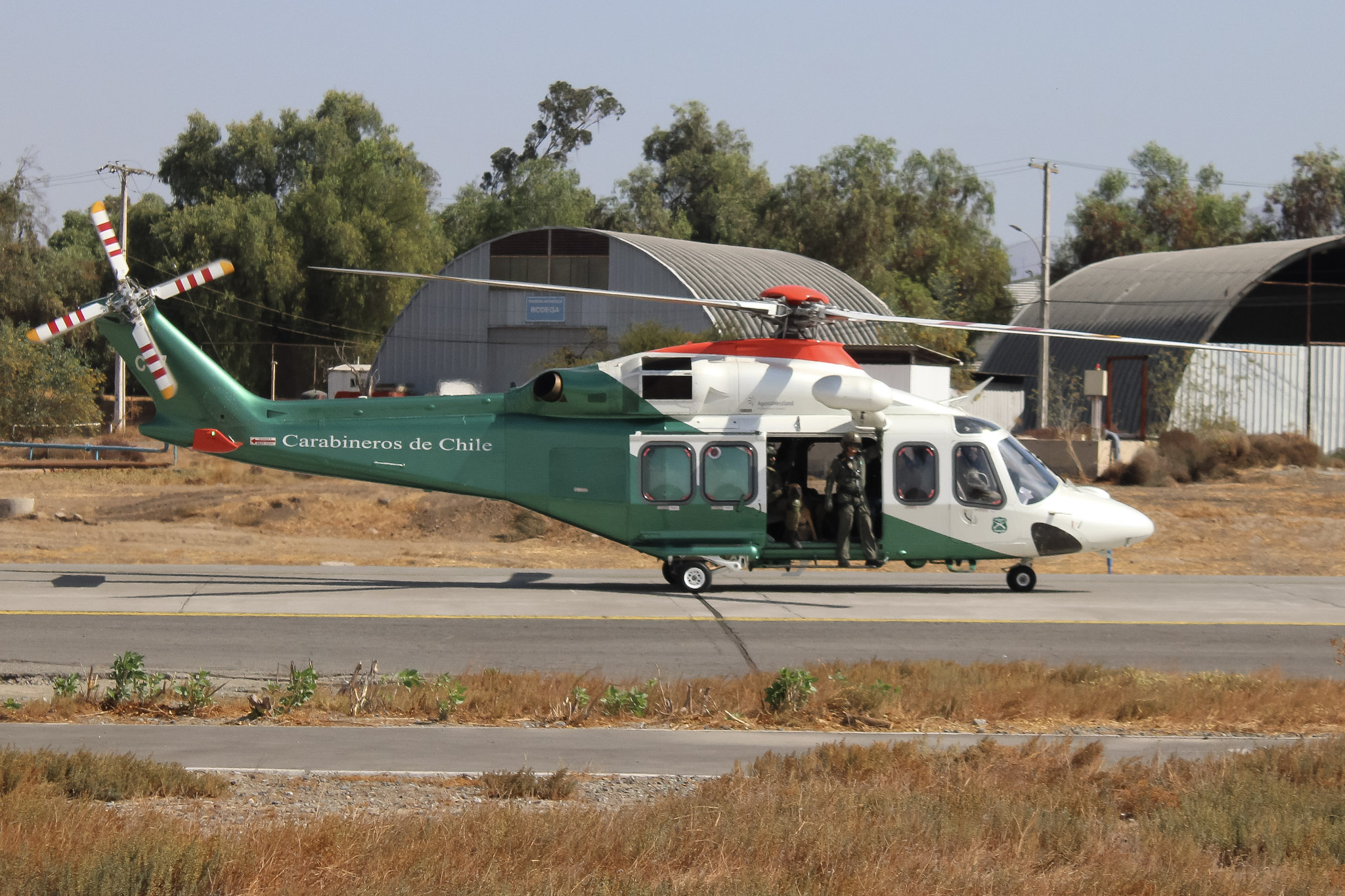
An AW139 used by the Carabineros de Chile

Abu Dhabi

- Abu Dhabi Police

Algeria

- Algerian Civil Defence

Australia

- Ambulance Victoria
- CHC Helicopter (under contract to the RAAF)
- RACQ LifeFlight
- RAC Rescue Helicopter
- Toll Ambulance Rescue
- Victoria Police
- Westpac Lifesaver Rescue Helicopter Service

Brazil

- Brazilian Federal Police

Bulgaria

- Bulgarian Border Police

Canada

- Ornge

Chile

- Carabineros de Chile

China

- Ministry of Public Security

Croatia

- Croatian Border Police

Cyprus

- Cyprus Police Aviation Unit

Greece

- Greek Civil Protection (3 on order)

Estonia

- Police and Border Guard Board

Faroe Islands

- Atlantic Airways

India

- Government of Uttar Pradesh (one planned as of 2025)

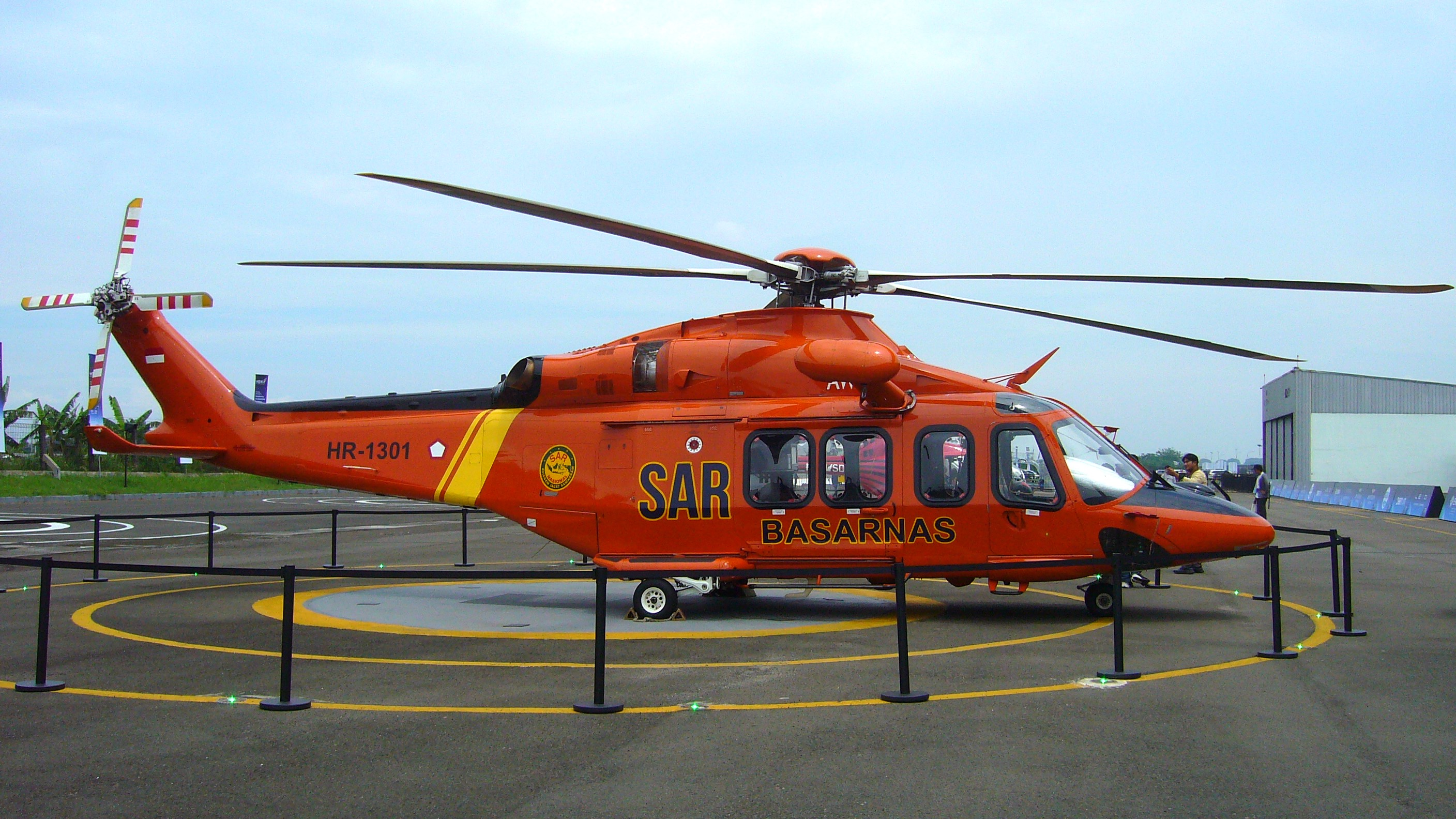
An AW139 of the National Search and Rescue Agency of Indonesia

Indonesia

- National Search and Rescue Agency, operated by Indonesian Air Force

Italy

- Polizia di Stato
- National Fire Service

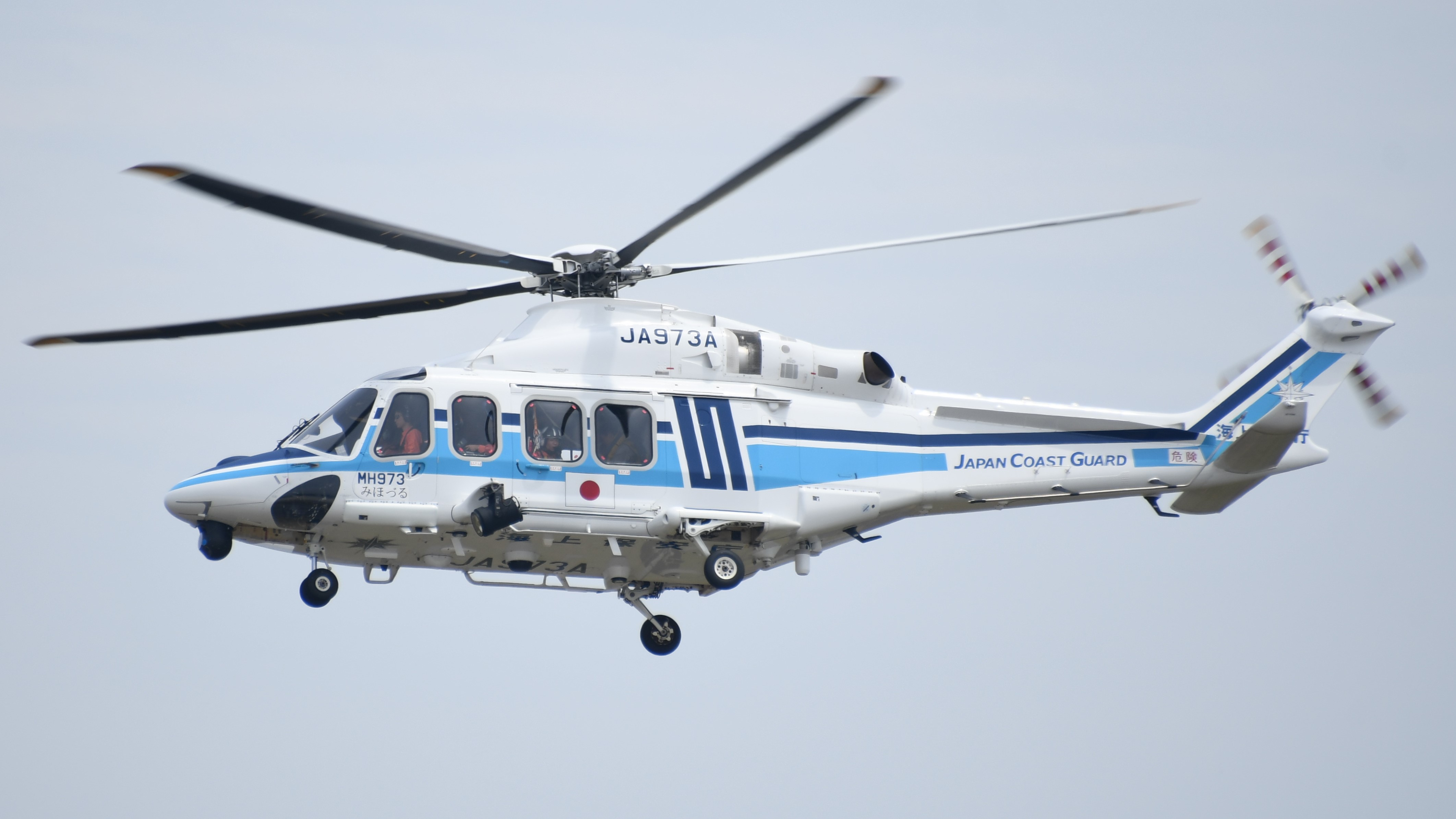
An AW139 with the Japan Coast Guard

Japan

- Tokyo Police Department (4 on order)
- Tokyo Fire Department
- Japan Coast Guard

Kenya

- Kenya Police

Lebanon

- Lebanese government

Malaysia

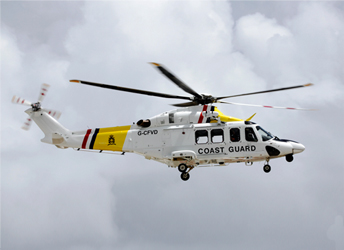
An AW139 from the Dutch Caribbean Coast Guard

- Malaysian Fire and Rescue Department
- Malaysian Maritime Enforcement Agency
- Royal Malaysia Police

Myanmar

- Ministry of Social Welfare, Relief and Resettlement

Morocco

- Royal Moroccan Air Force VIP transport

Netherlands

- Dutch Caribbean Coast Guard
- National Police

Oman

- Royal Oman Police

Pakistan

- Government of Pakistan

Spain

- Spanish Maritime Safety Agency

Sweden

- Swedish Maritime Administration

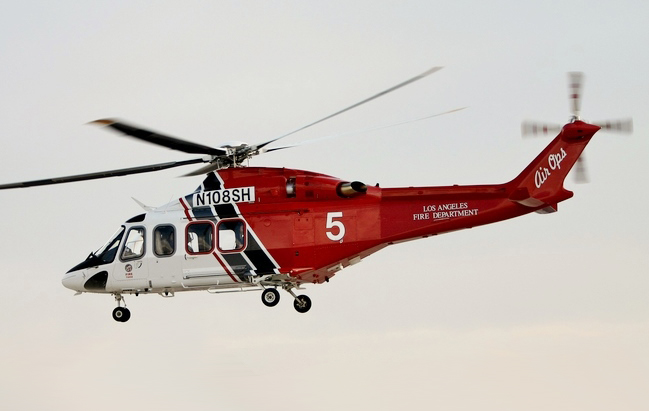
A Los Angeles City Fire Department AW139 taking off

United Kingdom

- His Majesty's Coastguard
- The King's Helicopter Flight
- Fleet Helicopter Support Unit

United States

- Los Angeles City Fire Department
- Maryland State Police
- Miami-Dade Fire Department
- New Jersey State Police
- U.S. Customs and Border Protection
- National Nuclear Security Administration

== Notable accidents ==
- On 19 August 2011, a Petrobras operated AW139 crashed in the sea at the Campos Basin in Brazil after taking off from an offshore oil platform, killing all four people on board.
- On 13 March 2014, Haughey Air AW139 (registration G-LBAL) crashed shortly after takeoff from Gillingham, Norfolk, United Kingdom, killing all four people on board.
- On 8 August 2016, a Kenyan National Police Airwing AgustaWestland AW139 Registration 5Y-NPS crash-landed in Mathare, Nairobi while on a routine surveillance mission with four occupants with all of them being seriously injured.
- On 29 December 2018, a United Arab Emirates emergency medical services AgustaWestland AW139 on a mission to lift an injured person clipped the world's longest zip line and crashed in Jebel Jais, Ras Al Khaimah, United Arab Emirates, killing all four crew members.
- On 2 February 2019, an AW139 operated by Caverton Helicopters carrying Nigeria's Vice president Yemi Osinbajo crash-landed in Kabba, Kogi State. Though there were no casualties, the closeness of the crash to the 2019 presidential election fueled speculation of possible foul play, but Caverton attributed the crash to bad weather.
- On 4 July 2019, seven people died when AW139 N32CC crashed off of a small Bahamian island at 2 am. The helicopter was found underwater hours later, about a mile offshore. A billionaire coal baron from Beckley, West Virginia, Chris Cline, his daughter Kameron and five others were onboard headed to Florida due to a medical emergency involving one of the passengers.
- On 1 February 2020, a Fukushima prefectural police AW139 helicopter crashed in a rice field in the city of Koriyama, in northeast Japan. Seven of the crew were hurt, including three police officers, two technicians, and two medical workers. The helicopter was carrying a heart for transplant surgery to the University of Tokyo Hospital. The transplant operation was cancelled due to heart being unable to be recovered in time for a successful transplant. The Fukushima meteorological office issued a strong winds warning to Koriyama at the time of the accident. On impact, the tail and main rotor blades snapped off.
- On 23 April 2024, a Royal Malaysian Navy AW139HOM with seven crew onboard collided with an RMN Eurocopter Fennec with three crew at the Royal Malaysian Navy base in Lumut, Perak. One of the helicopter's rotors clipped the other's, causing both to crash. The AW139 crashed onto the stadium inside the base. The incident occurred during a training flight in preparation for the 90th Naval Day celebration. All ten crew were killed in the crash.
- On 28 June 2026, a Saudi Aramco Aviation Leonardo AW139 crashed on Approach to Ras Tanura Airport, in Saudi Arabia, killing all 14 onboard.

== Specifications (AW139) ==
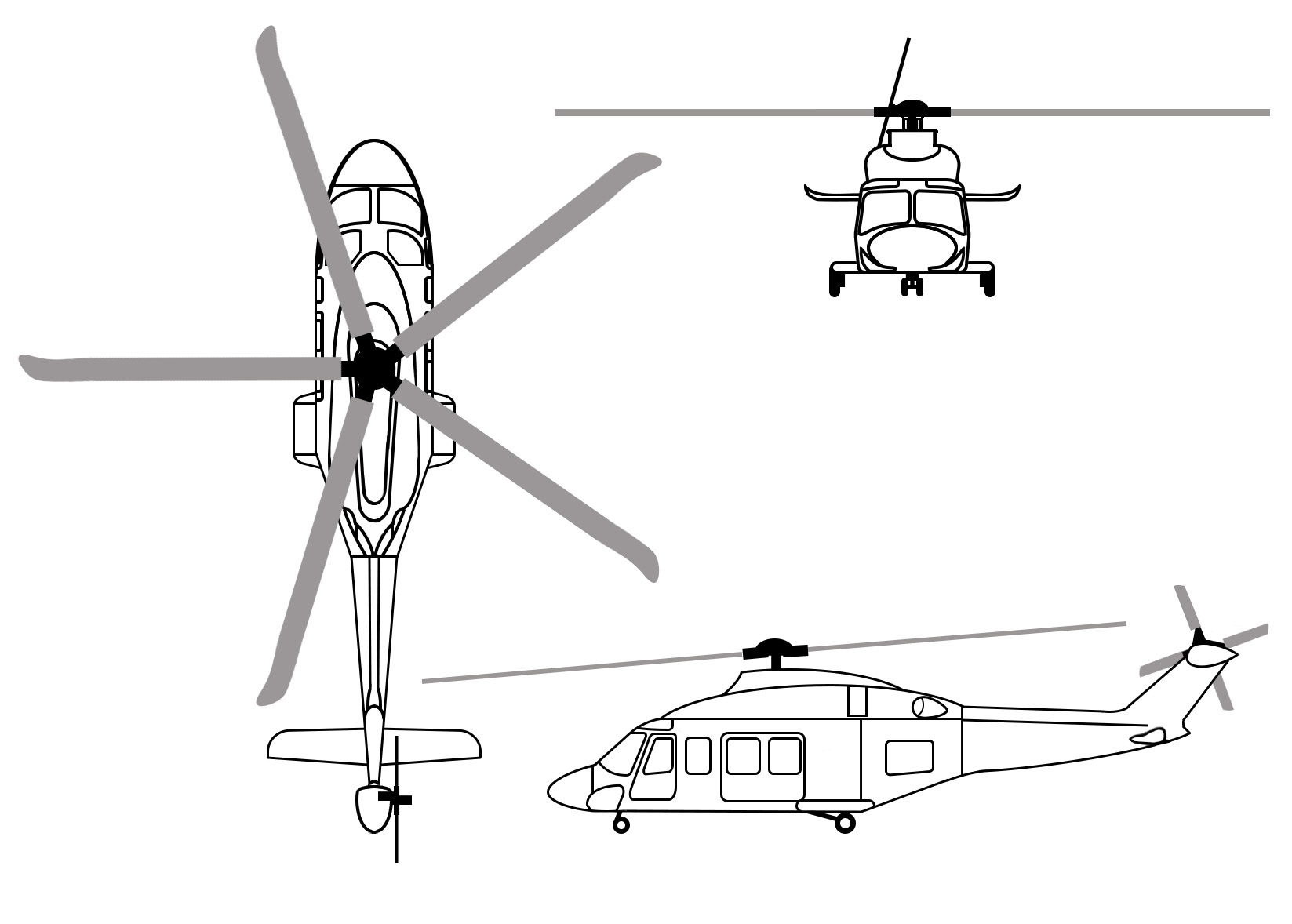
Drawing lines

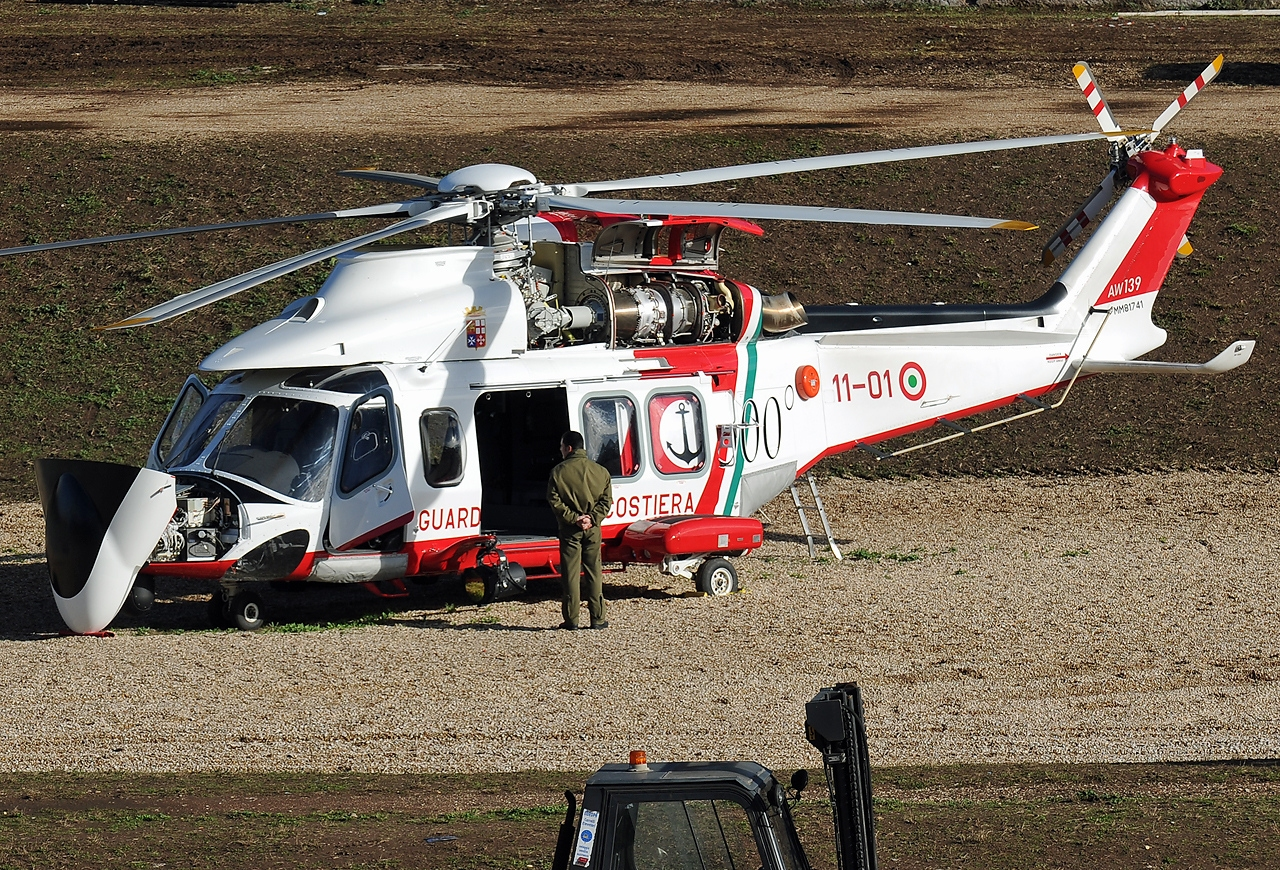
Guardia Costiera AW139 with engine doors, main gearbox sliding fairing and nose cowling opened

Data from AgustaWestland, EASA, Gajetti and Maggiore

General characteristics

- Crew: one or two
- Capacity: up to 15 passengers, depending on configuration
- Length: 16.66 m (54 ft 8 in)
- Width: 2.26 m (10 ft 0 in)
- Height: 4.98 m (16 ft 4 in)
- Gross weight: 6,400 kg (14,110 lb) (7,000 kg (15,000 lb) for 7 t version)
- Fuel capacity: 1,568 L (414 US gal)
- Powerplant: 2 × Pratt & Whitney Canada PT6C-67C turboshaft engine , 1,142 kW (1,531 hp) each
- Main rotor diameter: 13.80 m (45 ft 3 in)

Performance

- Maximum speed: 310 km/h (193 mph, 167 kn)
- Cruise speed: 306 km/h (191 mph, 165 kn)
- Range: 1,061 km (659 mi, 573 nmi)
- Endurance: 5 hours 13 minutes
- Service ceiling: 6,096 m (20,000 ft)
- Rate of climb: 10.9 m/s (2,140 ft/min)

== See also ==
External videos
- AW139 performing a sea rescue exercise in Valencia, 2013
- Documentary - Megafactories AgustaWestland AW139 Manufacturing
- AW139 lifting a sports car

- Helimer 207 helicopter accident

Related development

- AgustaWestland AW149
- AgustaWestland AW169
- AgustaWestland AW189
- Boeing MH-139 Grey Wolf

Aircraft of comparable role, configuration, and era

- Airbus Helicopters H160
- Airbus Helicopters H175
- Kamov Ka-60
- TAI T625
- Bell 525

Related lists

- List of helicopters
