= Bruno Spagnolini =

Italian engineer and businessman

Bruno Spagnolini is an Italian engineer and businessman who served as CEO of AgustaWestland, the helicopter-manufacturing division of Finmeccanica. After being charged in 2013 with participation in a bribery scandal (also known as choppergate), he resigned from the position as CEO. On 9 October 2014, an Italian court sentenced him to two years in prison for false bookkeeping. As of November 2014, an investigation in India was still underway.

== Early life and education ==
Spagnolini was born in 1950.

== Career ==
Spagnolini was chief executive officer of AgustaWestland from 2004 to 2007 and chief operating officer from 2007 to 2011. He became its chief executive in May 2011 when Giuseppe Orsi, the previous holder of that position, was promoted to chairman of Finmeccanica.

In a June 2011 interview, given shortly after his promotion to CEO, Spagnolini said that AgustaWestland had “always pursued a three-legged strategy based on an evolving product range, enlarging its network of service and training facilities as well as establishing strategic partnerships around the world to pursue market opportunities.” He said that development of the AW169 was “progressing as planned” and that “the rotors, blades, engines, avionics, transmission and electric power generation and distribution systems” all incorporated new technologies. He said that the firm was developing “navigation systems for preferred flightpaths and all-weather capabilities, advanced open architecture, common cockpit technology to be shared among present and future models, and unique collision avoidance and warning systems,” as well as “new rotor and blade technology.” He also described Russia and India as “two of the most promising markets for the future with incredible business opportunities that can be fully exploited through new industrial partnerships with prime local players of mutual benefit, well beyond the usual commercial and services solutions offered.”

Spagnolini unveiled a restored version of the Westland Lynx helicopter, the official holder of the helicopter World Speed Record, at the firm's Yeovil factory in July 2011. “To have held the world helicopter speed record for 25 years highlights what an outstanding achievement it was by all those involved in the project and the development of the rotor blade technology that was key to the successful record attempt,” he said.

On 14 March 2012, Spagnoligni took part in a ground-breaking ceremony at Hyderabad’s Rajiv Gandhi International Airport that marked “the start of construction of a new helicopter production facility and a new step in the development of the Indian aerospace industry.” He expressed pleasure at the firm's joint venture with the Indian firm Tata Sons, which, he said, would “play an important role in the development of the Indian aerospace industry.”

Spagnolini said in July 2012 that a new agreement between AgustaWestland and Russian Helicopters to jointly develop a new 2.5-ton helicopter “further expands our strong and successful co-operation” and marked “the next step up in terms of co-operation to address the future needs of the worldwide market.”

The 500th AW139 helicopter delivered by AgustaWestland was handed over by Spagnolini in July 2012 to Weststar Aviation Services during the Farnborough International Airshow in Hampshire, England.

A 9 July 2012, Flightglobal report stated that AgustaWestland was “introducing a modular family concept for its helicopter line-up, representing a change in mindset, which chief executive Bruno Spagnolini says must be implemented to ensure the future success of the Italian manufacturer.” Spagnolini explained that this new concept was “evidence of our product strategy and investments made in new technology,” and said that AgustaWestland was the first rotorcraft manufacturer to introduce “a real family of next generation commercial helicopters.” Calling the AW139 “a driver for our expansion in the market,” he said that the firm had “benefitted from lessons learned on this model to develop the AW169 and AW189, so establishing the advantage of common design philosophy across a range of platforms.”

Spagnoligni maintained that “the AgustaWestland product family is setting a new standard in helicopter fleet management” and would thus help the firm “meet the diversified and evolving requirements of the global commercial market.” He further noted that AgustaWestland was “continuing to play a leading role in new and revolutionary technologies such as the AW609,” and that in the military sector it was “continuing to develop the AW149 8t helicopter, as well as offering militarised versions of the commercial AW139 and incoming AW169.” He discussed the ongoing differentiation of operations at the firm's Yeovil plant in Britain, which would allow it “to respond to the changing balance between reduced defence spending and growth potential for commercial and parapublic applications in UK.” Also, he indicated that the firm was strengthening its “industrial presence in fast-growing markets which show huge potential: Russia, China and India.”

A report on 22 January 2013, stated that AgustaWestland had signed a memorandum of understanding with the Brazilian firm Embraer that, if it led to a final agreement, would provide for the establishment of “an assembly line in Brazil building helicopters for both the domestic and wider Latin American markets.” Spagnolini expressed pleasure at this sign of Italy establishing “an industrial presence” in Brazil.

== Helicopter scandal ==
Spagnolini and Orsi were charged in 2013 with arranging bribes in connection with the sale of 12 AW101 helicopters to the Indian government in 2010, when Orsi was CEO of AgustaWestland and Spagnolini was his deputy. The helicopters had been sold for a price of 560 million euros. The arrest warrant for Spagnolini and Orsi said they “presided over a system of bribery and corruption that was part of the company philosophy,” allegedly paying tens of millions of euros to Indian officials through intermediaries and falsifying invoices in order to win the high-profile contract. The specific charges were bribery, tax evasion, and fraud.

After being charged with these crimes, Spagnolini was dismissed from his position at AgustaWestland.

Their trial began on 19 June 2013. Eugenio Fusco, the prosecutor, stated that they had presided over a system of bribes and corruption that was part “of the company philosophy”, according to the arrest warrant. On the first day of the trial, the court stated that both the government of India and the Italian tax office were considered injured parties in the case, a designation that permitted them to participate in the questioning of witnesses and to seek damages in the case of a guilty verdict. Since defendants in Italy are not required to appear at their own trials, neither Spagnolini nor Orsi attended the trial's opening session.

In June, defence lawyers Ennio Amodio and Massimo Bassi argued at the trial that India should not be admitted as a civil party and that the Public Prosecutor's proposal to skip lengthy preliminary arguments was illegitimate and unconstitutional. But the judge rejected their arguments, and the Public Prosecutor explained that he wanted a speedy trial and that the “rock solid evidence” against the defendants warranted such a trial. Amodio insisted that it was clear that neither Orsi nor Spagnoligni had engaged in bribery because there was no need for it, given that AgustaWestland's helicopter was clearly the best being considered by India.

A report on 3 September 2013, noted that the corruption trial of Spagnolini and Orsi was set to resume within the month, “with defence lawyers prepared to call an international witness list of top government officials and industry leaders”. It was noted that possible defence witnesses included Ratan Tata, the former chairman of India's Tata Group; Indian defense minister A.K. Antony; and former UK defence secretary Geoffrey Hoon. The defence was “expected to argue that Orsi and Spagnolini did nothing outside the normal scope of accepted business practices in India in winning the contract.” A report noted that “AgustaWestland could be blacklisted by the Indian government under terms of its new and strict anti-corruption laws if Orsi and Spagnolini are convicted”, and that India had “begun its own inquiry into the matter”. This practically ended the so called "VVIP Chopper Deal" forever.

A Reuters report on 12 June 2014, stated that the verdict in the trial of Spagnolini and Orsi “could be crucial for Finmeccanica's efforts to restore its reputation at a time when the group is restructuring its business and fighting for contracts in emerging countries.” It was reported on 29 July 2014, that as Spagnolini and Orsi awaited sentencing, perhaps in October, for the helicopter deal, an Italian magistrate had halted a separate investigation into the alleged payment of kickbacks to secure the helicopter sale, while accepting a “negligible fine” as part of a settlement. In August 2014, India banned Finmeccanica from future government contracts.

On 9 October 2014, Spagnolini and Orsi were sentenced to two years in prison for false bookkeeping but were acquitted of international corruption, a charge on which the prosecutor had asked the court to sentence Orsi to six years in prison and Spagnolini to five years in prison. Judge Luisa Bovitutti said that the false bookkeeping conviction concerned 2009 and 2010 invoices. “In reading the verdict,” reported the Wall Street Journal, “the judge said that while prosecutors had proven that fake invoices had been issued, there was no corruption.” This represented an apparent rejection of the prosecution's argument that there existed “a direct connection between the false invoices and the payment of kickbacks.”

Orsi and Spagnolini's sentences were suspended.

At the time of the verdict, India was still pursuing its own investigation into the allegations of bribery. An Indian official said in early 2014 that the probe was “at an advanced stage” and that legal developments in Italy did not affect India's investigation.

On 16 December 2016, the Italian Supreme Court (Corte di Cassazione) annulled the verdict and ordered a retrial. On 8 January 2018, following the new appeal trial, Orsi was acquitted of both international corruption and false invoicing charges. The acquittal was confirmed by the Supreme Court the following year.
