= Qatar Civil Aviation Authority =

Government agency of Qatar

Civil Aviation Authority

Authority overview
- Formed: 2001
- Jurisdiction: Government of Qatar
- Parent department: Ministry of Transport and Communication
- Key document: Law No. 15 of 2002 on Civil Aviation
- Website: caa.gov.qa/en-us

The Civil Aviation Authority (QCAA, Arabic: الهيئة العامة للطيران المدني في قطر) is an agency of the government of Qatar. Its head office is in Doha. It was established in 2001. Hamad International Airport in Qatar was developed under the supervision of Civil Aviation Authority (Qatar).

== History ==
The authority's predecessor, the Civil Aviation Department, was established in 1973. In August 2001, Law No. 16 of 2001 was passed, decreeing the Civil Aviation Department and the Meteorology Department be merged into one entity, thereafter known as the Civil Aviation Authority.
