= Z15 =

Z15 may refer to:

- Avicopter Z-15, a 7-ton class medium utility helicopter being developed by Eurocopter and AVIC
- German destroyer Z15 Erich Steinbrinck, a Type 1934A destroyer built for the German Navy in the mid-1930s
- HMCS Cougar (Z15), an armed yacht that served in the Royal Canadian Navy as a patrol vessel from 1940 to 1945
- IBM z15 (microprocessor), a microprocessor chip in mainframe computers
- Z15/16 Beijing–Harbin through train, a non-stop express train between Beijing and Harbin, China
