= New Medium Helicopter =

Military helicopter

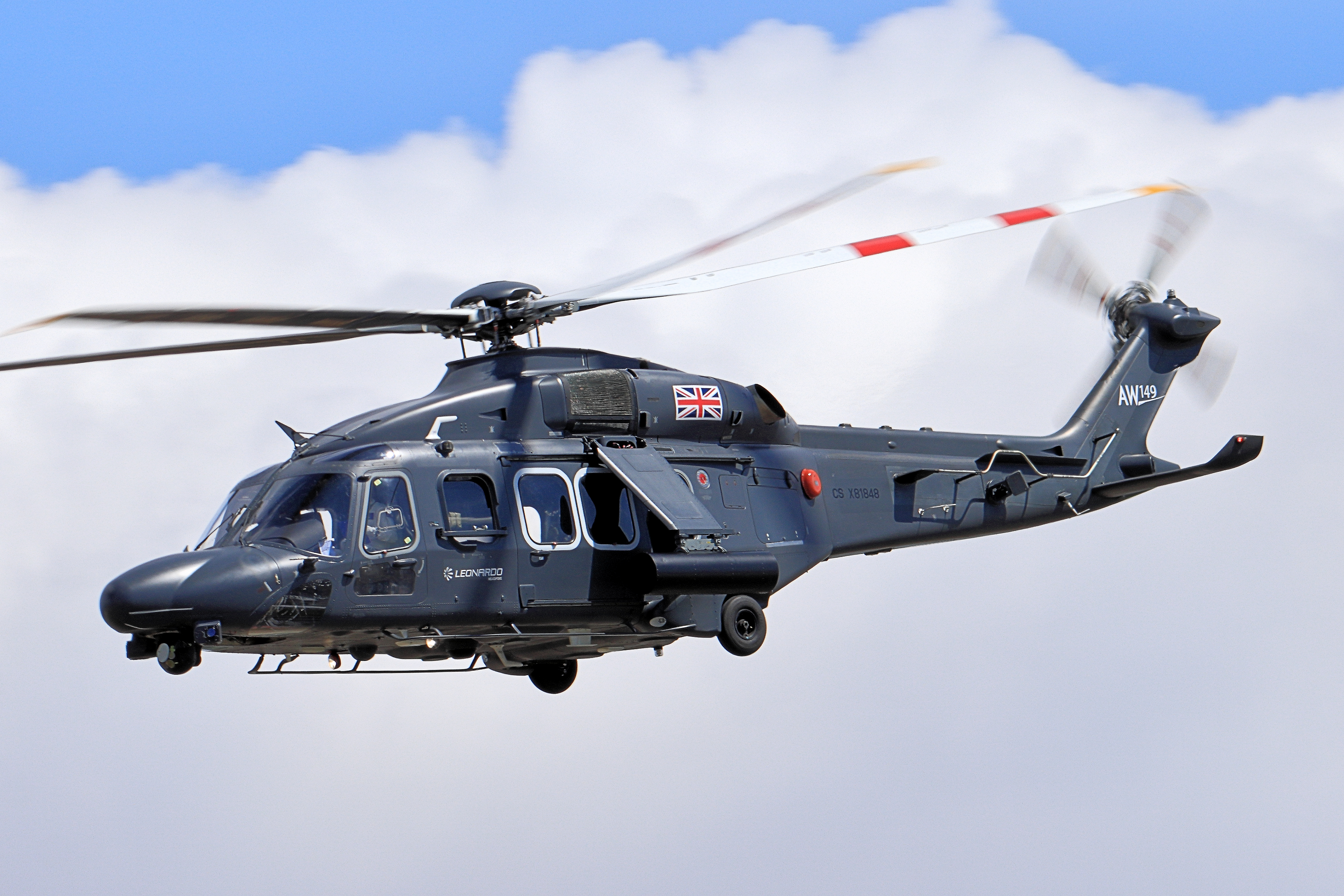
- The Leonardo AW149 was selected in February 2026 to fulfil the New Medium Helicopter requirement

General information
- Project for: Procurement of a fleet of medium-lift helicopters
- Issued by: UK Ministry of Defence
- Service: British Army; Royal Air Force
- Proposals: Airbus H175M; Leonardo AW149; Sikorsky S-70M Black Hawk
- Requirement: Initially, up to 44 medium lift helicopters, final assembly line, training & support

History
- Initiated: 2021
- Outcome: Leonardo selected to deliver 23 AW149 and four training simulators

The New Medium Helicopter (NMH) is a British military programme to procure 23 medium-lift support helicopters to replace the Royal Air Force's Westland Puma HC2. The programme was launched in 2021 and in February 2026 the Leonardo AW149 was selected to fulfil the requirement.

The initial requirement was for up to 44 medium-lift support helicopters, to replace the Puma HC2 and the Bell 412 Griffin operated by the Royal Air Force; and the Bell 212 and Airbus AS365 Dauphin operated by the British Army. By the mid 2020s, only the Puma HC2 was intended for replacement, the other types have already been retired, remaining in service or being replaced by other aircraft.

Three manufacturers expressed interest in the contract, Airbus Helicopters offering the H175M, Leonardo Helicopters offering the AW149 and Lockheed Martin offering the S-70M Blackhawk. By the deadline in August 2024, only Leonardo had submitted a bid.

== Programme aims ==
The initial New Medium Helicopter programme had the objective of providing UK Joint Aviation Command with a modern medium-lift helicopter, replacing outdated aircraft used by the British Army, the Royal Air Force. The programme aims to achieve this by:

- Delivering five helicopter requirements through a single aircraft type to enhance commonality, thereby improving efficiency and operational flexibility.
- Using open systems architecture that supports the quick integration of various role-specific equipment and carry-on gear, allowing for future upgrades to address evolving threats.
- Developing training and support that uses a mixture of regular & reserve military personnel, Ministry of Defence (MOD) civil servants and contractors to provide maintenance, logistics, and training of helicopter aircrew, ground crew, and engineers.

== Background ==
In March 2021, the MOD published Defence in a Competitive Age, which indicated that it would invest in a new medium-lift helicopter in the mid-2020s. The Defence and Security Industrial Strategy, published at the same time, outlined that to maintain cost-effective access to upgrades and support for the helicopter fleet, the MOD's intention was to consolidate existing fleets, through their replacement by a new aircraft acquired through the NMH programme.

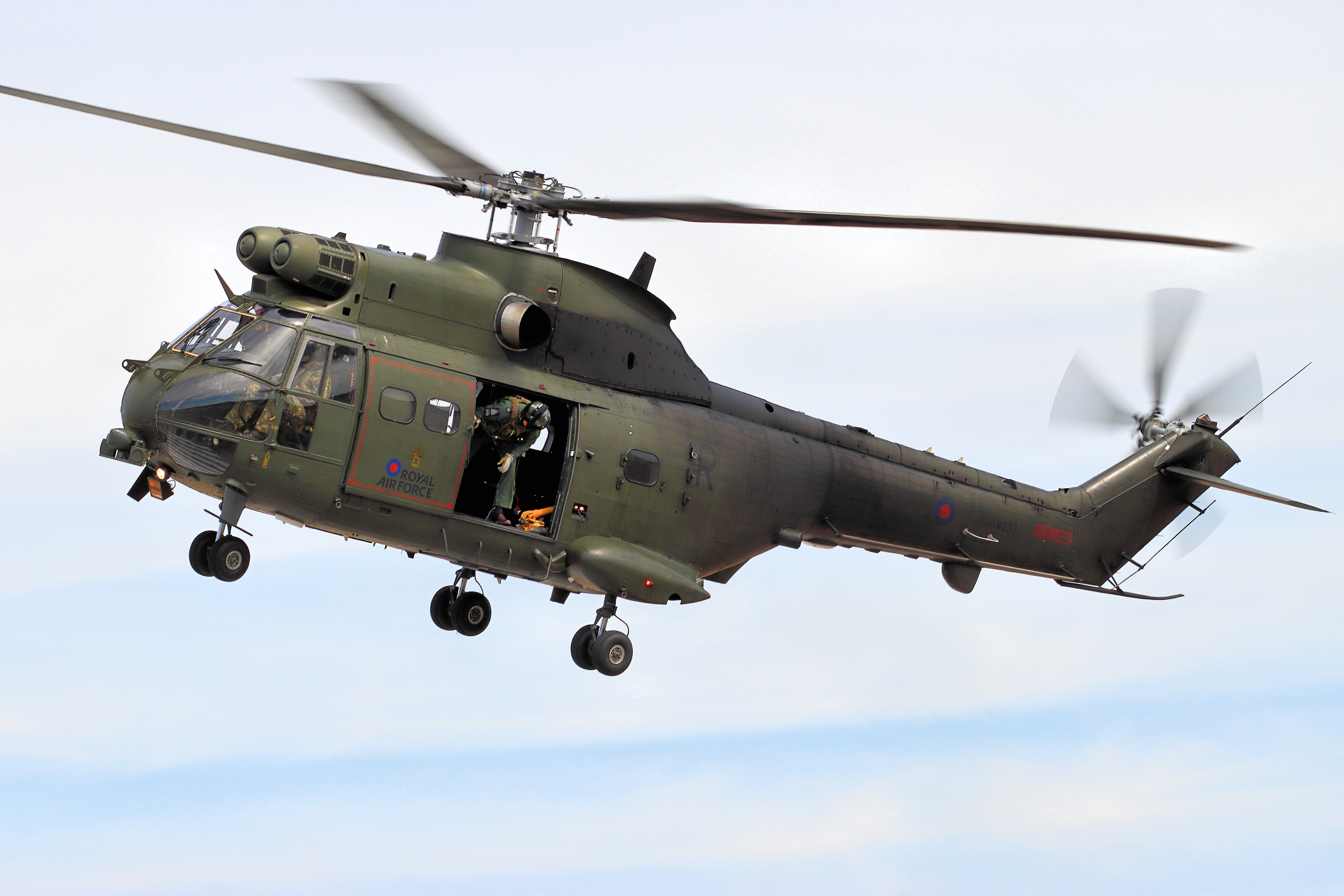
An RAF Westland Puma HC2

Initially, the aircraft to be replaced were the Royal Air Force's twenty-three Westland Puma HC2 and three Bell 412 Griffin; and the British Army's three Bell 212 and six Airbus AS365 Dauphin. The Puma HC2 fleet was planned to be supported until at least 2028. The Griffin and Bell 212, which supported British Forces Cyprus and British Forces Brunei, were replaced by the Puma in 2023 and 2022 respectively.

In September 2021, despite the MOD having yet to release a formal requirement, Airbus Helicopters, Leonardo and Sikorsky (part of Lockheed Martin) displayed their proposals to meet the NMH requirement at the DSEI 2021 defence exhibition.

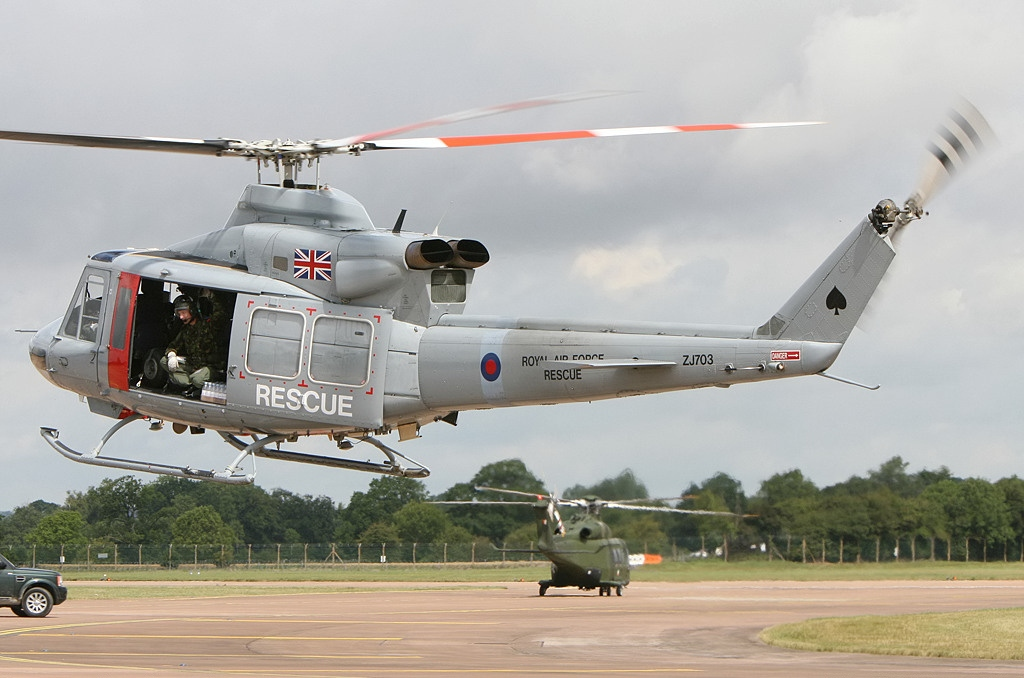
An RAF Griffin HAR2 which was retired from service in 2022

In October 2021, the MOD indicated that no final decision had been taken on the method of procurement, but that the expectation was that it will be subject to a competition. In November 2021, a prior information notice was published, which outlined the scope of the project and the intention to carry out early engagement with potential suppliers. It was anticipated that 36 to 44 new helicopters would be procured, as well as two cockpit flight simulators and one cabin simulator. At this stage the estimated cost of the contract was £1 billion and it was anticipated to run from October 2023 until October 2028.

In the meantime and separately from the NMH programme, the MOD published a transparency notice in November 2023 indicating its intention to acquire six Airbus H145M helicopters, to be known as the Jupiter HC2, for use in Cyprus and Brunei. The first Jupiter was delivered in May 2025 and the aircraft entered service in December 2025.

Janes reported in February 2024, that the AS365 Dauphins used by army's special forces would now remain in service for the foreseeable future.

The Puma was expected to continue is service until March 2028, however its early withdrawal was announced in November 2024, with the last flight taking place on 31st March 2025 when it was retired.

== Programme launch ==
In May 2022, the MOD published a contract notice, officially commencing the competition and confirming the intention to acquire up to 44 aircraft. The contact included air and ground crew training as well as in-service technical support and maintenance. The contract was worth between £900 million and £1.2 billion. Although no contract start date was indicated, it is specified as running for seven years from the date of award. Invitations to tender were expected to be issued by the MOD by 30 September 2022.

In October 2022, the MOD selected four contenders to progress to the next stage, Airbus offering the H175M, Boeing with an undisclosed aircraft, Leonardo offering the AW149 and Lockheed Martin offering the S-70 Blackhawk. Other contenders which were suggested as potential bids were the AceHawk Aerospace ML-70 (a variant of the Blackhawk); the H160M Guepard and H225M Caracal by Airbus Helicopters; the UH-1Y Venom and 525 Relentless by Bell; the Bell Boeing V-22 Osprey; and the NHIndustries NH90.

Bell and AceHawk Aerospace did not pass the pre-qualification questionnaire. In March 2023, Boeing confirmed that rather than offering its own aircraft, which it was anticipated would have been the MH-139 Grey Wolf, it would be partnering with Airbus on the H175M bid.

In July 2023, the defence media reported that the number of aircraft to be acquired had been reduced to a maximum of 35. The MOD denied it had reduced the quantity under consideration, stating "There has been no change to the advertised requirement in the New Medium Helicopter contract notice that was published in May 2022." The MOD added that "the second half of the competition will be launched later [in 2023]."

== Bids ==
In February 2024, bidding was opened for the programme as the invitation to negotiate phase was launched. Three manufacturers, Airbus Helicopters, Leonardo Helicopters and Lockheed Martin were expected to submit bids, with a closing date of 30 August 2024.

Throughout 2024, defence industry sources again indicated that the expected order size would be reduced, potentially to 25-35 aircraft, with the MOD declining to comment on the exact figure. In May 2024, a senior executive of Spirit AeroSystems, part of the Airbus bid, stated that the size of the contract would be for around 30 helicopters.

Shortly before the deadline for bids, Airbus announced it was withdrawing from the contest, stating that it would be "unable to formulate a responsible bid that would in parallel satisfy the customer’s requirements and provide adequate long-term returns to the business while implying a reasonable prospect of winning,”. Lockheed Martin also withdrew prior to the bid deadline, explaining that "We believe that Black Hawk remains the best solution both for the UK armed forces… but have elected not to submit a response to the New Medium Helicopter [tender] as we could not meet its minimum requirements in today’s market conditions,". This left the AW149 as the only contender.

The Strategic Defence Review announced in July 2024 by the Labour government raised speculation that the project could face cancellation to make budget savings. In early December 2024, the Minister for Defence Procurement and Industry indicated that the evaluation of the bid is ongoing with the process expected to be complete in the first half of 2025.

== Initial contenders ==
There were three initial contenders for the NMH contract.

=== Airbus Helicopters H175M ===
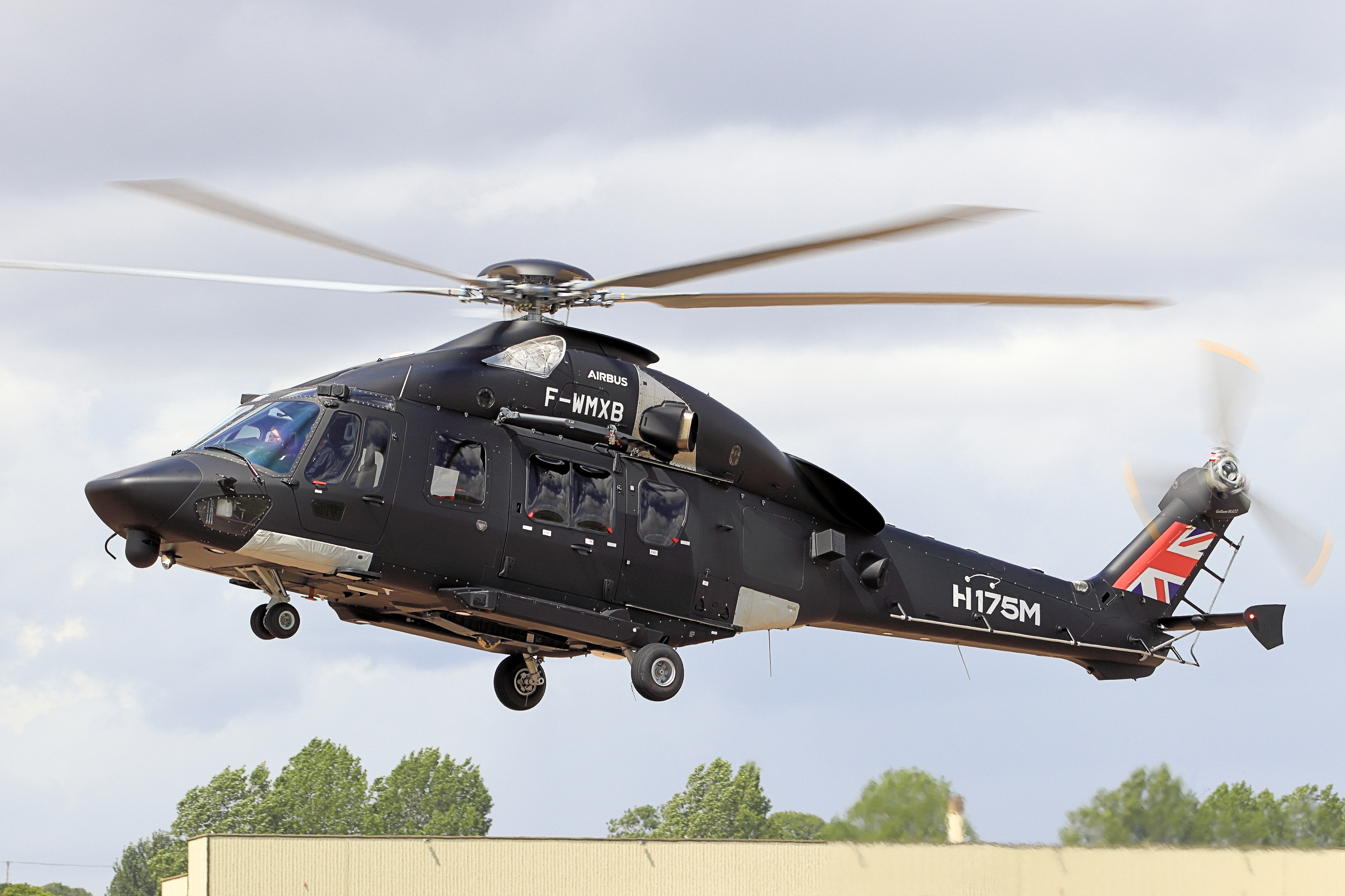
Airbus Helicopters H-175M

European multinational company Airbus Helicopters offered a military version of the H175, designated as the H175M. It is a twin-engine helicopter which according to Airbus has the largest cabin space and fuel capacity in its class.

Airbus was to partner with Boeing Defence UK, Babcock, Martin-Baker and Spirit AeroSystems to form the H175m Task Force. Pratt & Whitney Canada was to supply PT6C-67E turbo-shaft engines.

The H175M was to be manufactured at Airbus's factory located at Hawarden Airport, Broughton, Wales.

=== Leonardo AW149 ===
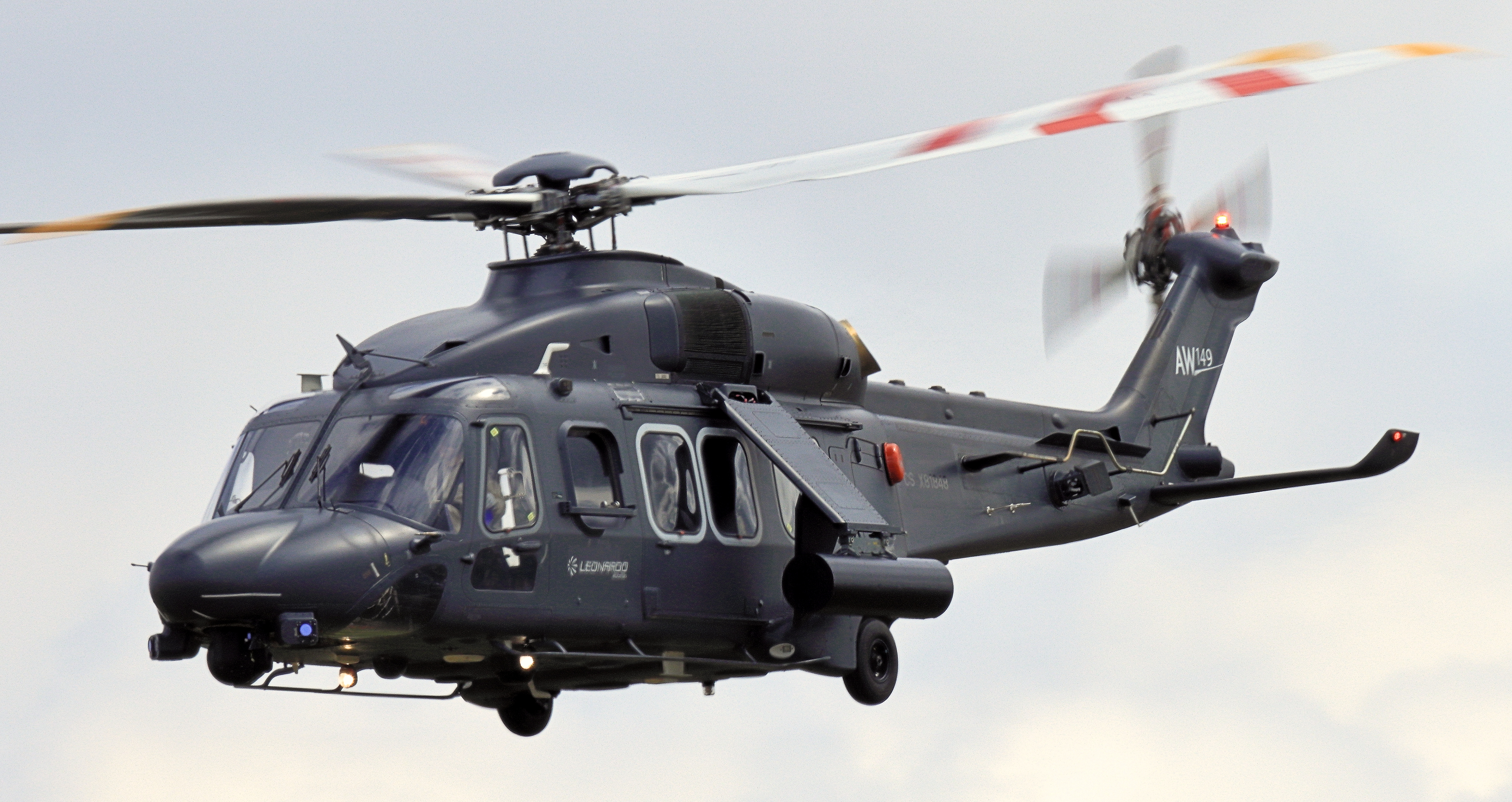
Leonardo AW149

Italian manufacturer Leonardo offered the AW149. Partner companies forming Team AW149 UK included Aerco, Chelton, Ford Aerospace, Helitune, LFD and RDDS Avionics. The AW149 operates with either two General Electric CT7-2E1 engines or two Safran Aneto-1K engines.

Leonardo has indicated that it would assemble the AW149 at a new assembly-line at its Yeovil facility in Somerset, England. Yeovil would act as a 'final assembly facility' due to Italy's investment in the main AW189/AW149 production line in Brindisi, Italy.

The AW149 is already operated by the Royal Thai Army, Egyptian Navy and Polish Land Forces.

=== Sikorsky S-70 Black Hawk ===
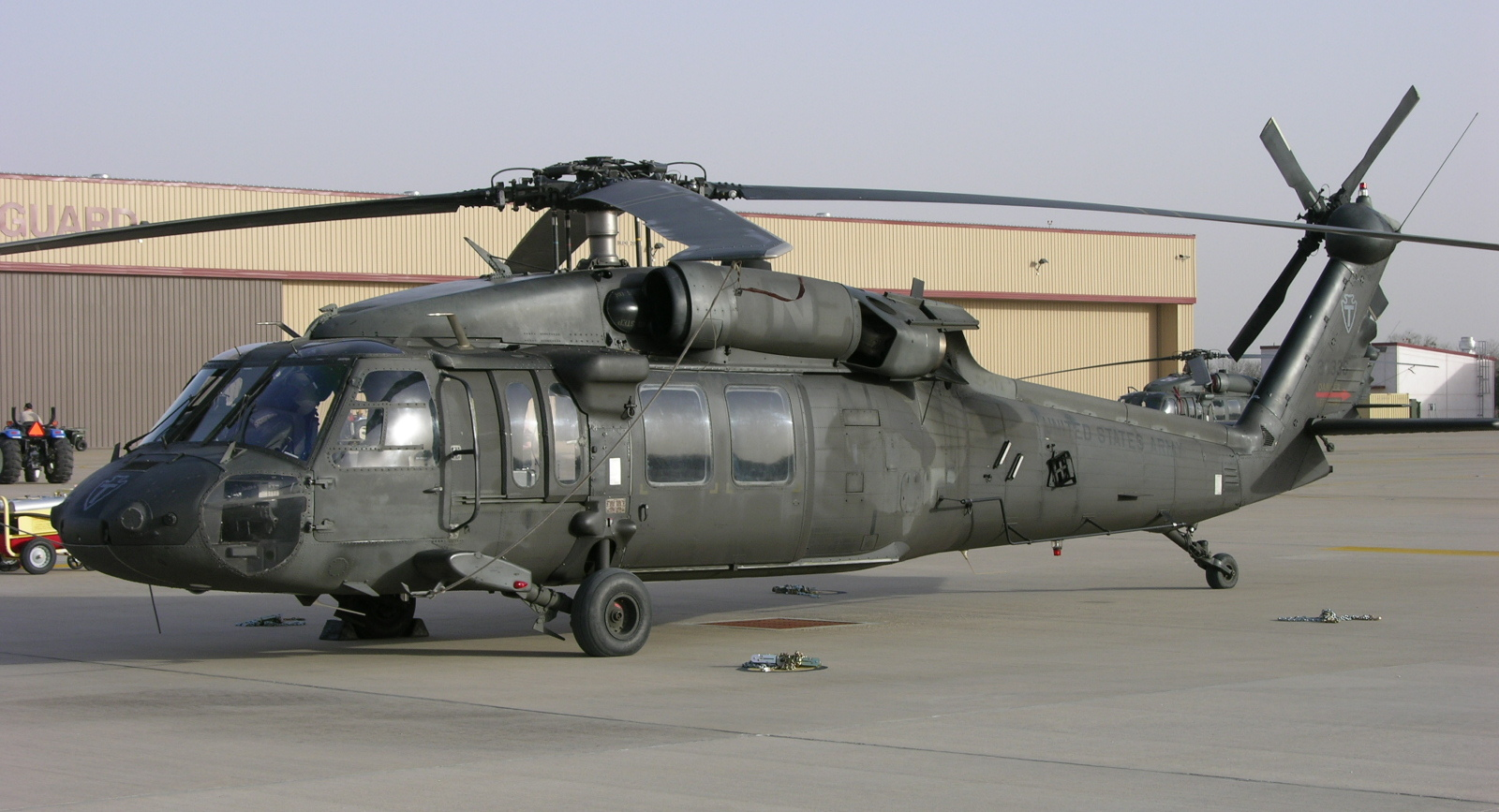
A Sikorsky UH-60L Black Hawk operated by the US Army

Lockheed Martin, through its Sikorsky Aircraft subsidiary, offered the S-70 Black Hawk. The Black Hawk was the only contender which was designed as a military helicopter and is combat proven, rather than being a military version of a civilian airframe. Entering service in 1979, the Black Hawk is operated by 34 countries, including the US military which had over 2,000 examples across a range of variants.

Lockheed Martin had selected StandardAero to carry out final assembly of the aircraft in Gosport, England.

=== Comparison table ===
Puma HC2 vs possible NMH bids
| Company | Model | Passengers | MTOW (kg) | Range (km) | Never Exceed speed (kt) | Cruise speed (kt) | First flight year | Flight hours | Length(m) | Width (m) | Height (m) | Production site | Min. op temp (°C) | Max op. temp (°C) |
|---|---|---|---|---|---|---|---|---|---|---|---|---|---|---|
| Aérospatiale | Puma HC2 | 16 | 7,400 | 550 | 167 | 134 | 1965 | 30,000+ | 18.2 | 3.5 | 5.14 | Hayes, Middlesex | -30 | +40 |
| Airbus Helicopters | H175M | 18 | 7,800 | 1,083 | 175+ | 160+ | 2009 | 145,000+ | 18.06 | 3.35 | 5.34 | Airbus Broughton | -40 | +50 |
| Leonardo Helicopters | AW149 | 19 | 8,000 | 849 | 170 | 155 | 2009 | unknown | 17.57 | 3.02 | 5.07 | Yeovil/Westland Airport | -40 | +55 |
| Sikorsky Aircraft | S-70M | 11 troops (+12th seat quick install option) | 9,979 | 460 | 195 | 160 | 1974 | 14,000,000+ | 19.76 | 4.37 | 5.33 | StandardAero Gosport | -40 | +55 |

== Aircraft selection ==
On 26 February 2026, it was announced that the Leonardo AW149 had been selected to fulfil the New Medium Helicopter requirement. A £1 billion contract is expected to see Leonardo deliver 23 helicopters and four training simulators. The contract is also expected to ensure the continuation of the UK’s sovereign helicopter manufacturing capabilities and supports Leonardo’s facility located in Yeovil, establishing it as a centre of excellence for autonomous military helicopters.

The AW149 will use the CT7 turboshaft engine manufactured by GE Aerospace. Each helicopter will be equipped with two engines, providing a combined output of approximately 4,000 shp. The CT7-2E1 is already used on AW149s operated by other nations, including Poland, and its selection provides commonality with other UK military applications of the CT7/T700 engine family. Engine assembly, maintenance and overhaul for the UK fleet are planned to be undertaken in the United Kingdom, with StandardAero’s facility at Gosport supporting the programme. The selection was made over the alternative Safran Aneto-1K, with the CT7-2E1 offering established operational experience and lower fuel consumption, although with less available power than the Aneto installation.

Following the selection of the AW149, Leonardo began preparations at its Yeovil facility in Somerset for production of the UK aircraft. The 23 helicopters are to be assembled at Yeovil, making the site the final assembly location for the British fleet and supporting the continuation of UK-based military helicopter manufacturing. Leonardo has also identified potential export opportunities for AW149s produced at Yeovil. The facility is additionally involved in the development of Leonardo’s Proteus uncrewed rotorcraft technology demonstrator, although this programme is separate from the New Medium Helicopter requirement.

== See also ==
- Future of the British Army
- Future of the Royal Air Force
