= AgustaWestland AW149 =

Military helicopter

AW149
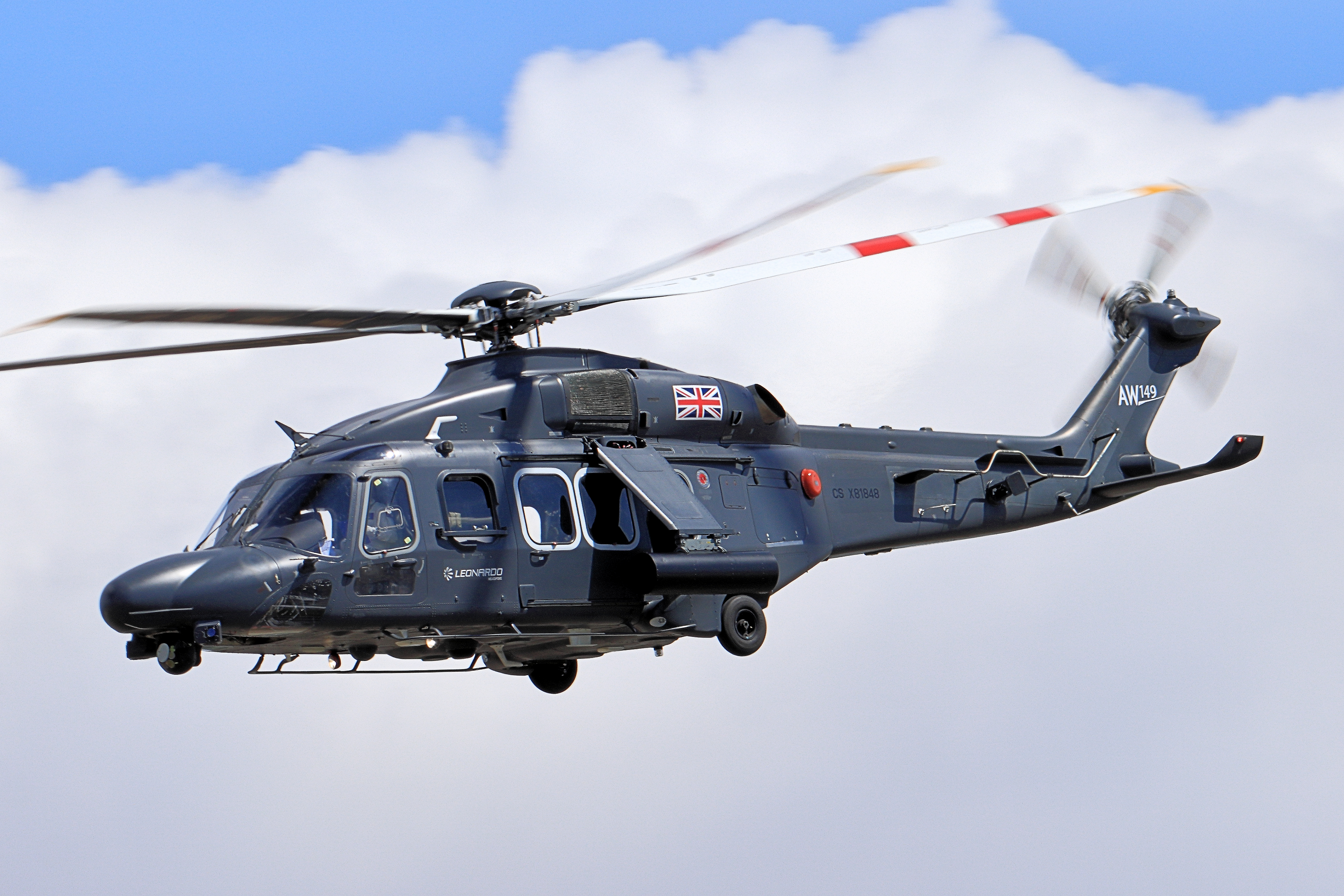
- AW149 over RIAT in 2022

General information
- Type: Medium-lift military helicopter
- National origin: Italy
- Manufacturer: AgustaWestland; Finmeccanica; Leonardo S.p.A.
- Status: In service
- Primary users: Egyptian Navy Royal Thai Army; Polish Army

History
- Manufactured: 2009–present
- First flight: 13 November 2009
- Developed from: AgustaWestland AW139
- Variant: AgustaWestland AW189
- Developed into: Leonardo Helicopters AW249

The AgustaWestland AW149 is a medium-lift multi-role military helicopter developed by AgustaWestland, now Leonardo.

The programme was publicly launched in July 2006; the first prototype performed its maiden flight in November 2009. In June 2011, AgustaWestland announced that it was developing a civilian version of the AW149, the AW189. By 2014, the AW149 had received military flight certification; the Royal Thai Army were the first export customer for the type; additional sales have been made to Egypt and North Macedonia. Both Poland and the United Kingdom, who have placed military orders for the type, will have domestic production lines.

== Design and development ==
Work on the AW149 begun during the early 2000s. From the onset, it was designed as military-oriented rotorcraft; priorities during the design phase included the ability to operate under austere circumstances, availability maximisation, reducing through-life costs, and survivability on the battlefield. In comparison to the preceding AW139, with which it shares numerous similarities, the AW149 has been furnished with a larger fuselage and more powerful engines, which have resulted in an increased cargo volume and payload carrying ability. The AW149 programme's existence was revealed at the 2006 Farnborough Air Show; it was openly marketed as an alternative to the Sikorsky UH-60 Black Hawk family.

As a dedicated military helicopter, the AW149 has been designed to be compatible with a variety of armaments, to facilitate armed escort and suppressive fire missions, as well as for the transporting of up to 15 troops on crashworthy seats as a troop transport. The sizable cabin is furnished with large sliding doors that permit the loading of bulky equipment as well as rapid egress from the rotorcraft. Through the use of various equipment packages, the AW149 can be configured for roles such as search and rescue, command and control, medical evacuation and the external lifting of underslung payloads. It has been equipped with a five-bladed main rotor, generating relatively low vibration and noise levels, and is capable of attaining a cruise speed of 160 knots. Dependent on customer demand, a rotor de-icing system may be installed. The AW149 is capable of single or dual pilot operations under all weather conditions, day or night. Intended to be an affordable multi-mission helicopter, it will be offered with a range of support solutions to minimize through-life support costs.

The AW149 is be equipped with a fully-digital four-axis automatic flight control system along with fully integrated avionics that use an open-system architecture; the latter permits customers to integrate their own specific and future mission systems. Other avionics elements include comprehensive communications and navigation systems and an integrated health and usage monitoring system. The cockpit display system comprises large area active matrix liquid crystal displays. It has been designed to fulfil the latest military and civil certification requirements at the time of its development; to this end, it is equipped with a crashworthy and damage tolerant airframe, along with a moderate degree of system redundancy to provide high levels of survivability and crashworthiness. The AW149 reportedly possesses a high level of ballistic tolerance and can be optionally outfitted with a defensive aids suite and weapon systems, making it suitably prepared to operate within high threat environments. The fuel tanks, which are both crashworthy and self sealing, are located behind the main cabin, which permits a relatively low-level cabin floor to ease loading/unloading while retaining ample ground clearance even on rough terrain. A heavy-duty wheeled tricycle landing gear allows operations from unprepared surfaces as well as easy manoeuvrability while on the ground.

On 13 November 2009, the first prototype conducted its maiden flight from AgustaWestland's Vergiate manufacturing facility in northern Italy. On 26 February 2011, the second prototype, the first to be powered by production model engines, made its first flight from Vergiate. On 20 June 2011, AgustaWestland announced the launch of the AW189, a civilian development of the AW149. In response to customer demand for the AW189, it was decided to accelerate development of the AW189 and effectively deprioritise marketing of the AW149 throughout much of the 2010s. During early 2013, the AW149 underwent specific flight testing under high heat and high altitude environmental conditions in Arizona, US.

During the 2014 Farnborough Air Show, it was announced that the AW149 had attained military certification, a key development milestone.

== Operational history ==
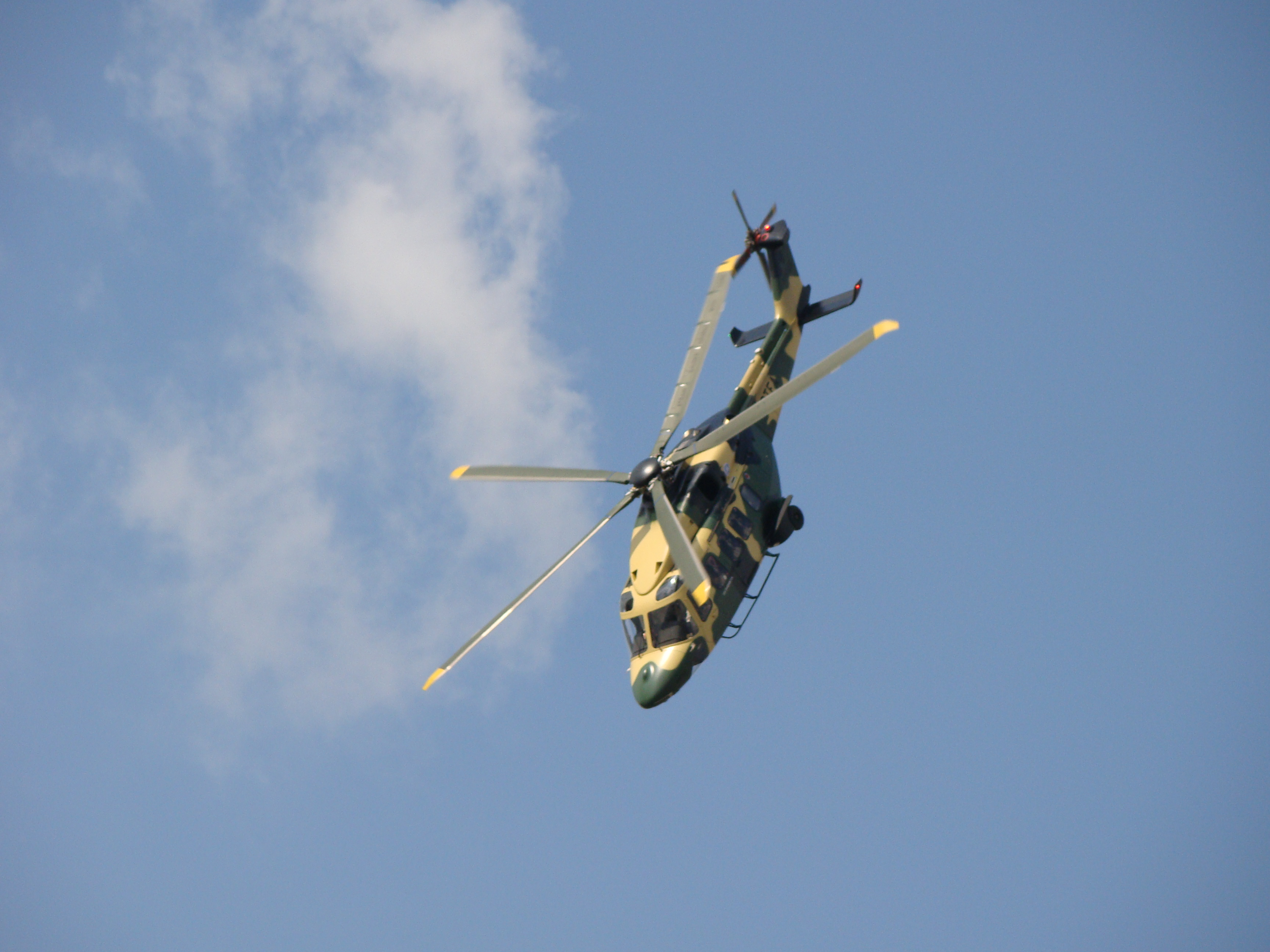
AW149 on presentation flight in 2012

The first export customer for the type was Thailand, which placed an initial $80 million order for five AW149s to replace its aging Bell UH-1H rotorcraft in 2015. While the Italian Air Force evaluated the type for use in the search and rescue role during the 2010s, the service ultimately selected the lighter AW139M instead.

In April 2019, the Egyptian Navy ordered 24 AW149s with option for 10 more; the first deliveries took place during the following year.

AgustaWestland submitted a version of the AW149, designated TUHP149, as a candidate for the Turkish Utility Helicopter Program (TUHP) for the Turkish Armed Forces. The programme sought an initial batch of 109 helicopters worth $4 billion, prospective follow-on orders for subsequent batches may eventually rise to 300 rotorcraft. On 21 April 2011, the Turkish defence minister announced that the Sikorsky S-70i Black Hawk had been selected as the winner.

Leonardo submitted the AW149 for the UK's New Medium Helicopter programme, which seeks a replacement for the RAF's Westland Puma HC2 and the British Army's Airbus AS365 Dauphin helicopters; it was stated that the type would be assembled at Leonardo's Yeovil factory if the bid is successful. Following the withdrawal of Airbus and Sikorsky Aircraft from the bidding process, the AW149 was the only official bid. On 28 February 2026, Leonardo confirmed that a deal to build 23 AW149s had been signed.

In June 2022, Poland's defence minister stated that Poland would order 32 AW149 helicopters and that production was to take place at Leonardo's PZL Świdnik factory. The contract was signed on 1 July 2022, and has a value of $1.85 billion (€1.76 billion). Delivery is planned to take place between 2023 and 2029. In June 2024, the Polish AW149 production line was opened; the first locally-produced AW149 came off the assembly line in Świdnik in February 2025.

During 2023, Leonardo offered the AW149 as a replacement for the Sikorsky S-61A-4 Nuri of the Royal Malaysian Air Force. The Malaysian authorities evaluated a two stage procurement proposal, which was reported to involve 12 AW149s configured for Combat Search and Rescue (CSAR) missions and a further 12 for utility use. In November 2024, it was announced that Leonardo had been awarded a $3.5 billion contract to lease 28 AgustaWestland series helicopters to the government agencies, including Malaysian Armed Forces for a 15 year period; of these, 12 AW149 will be flown by the Royal Malaysian Air Force and 4 will be flown by the Malaysian Army Aviation.

During the 2026 Farnborough International Airshow, Leonardo and PT E-Systems Solutions Indonesia signed a letter of intent (LoI) for the possible procurement of AW149 search-and-rescue helicopters for the Indonesian Navy.

== Operators ==
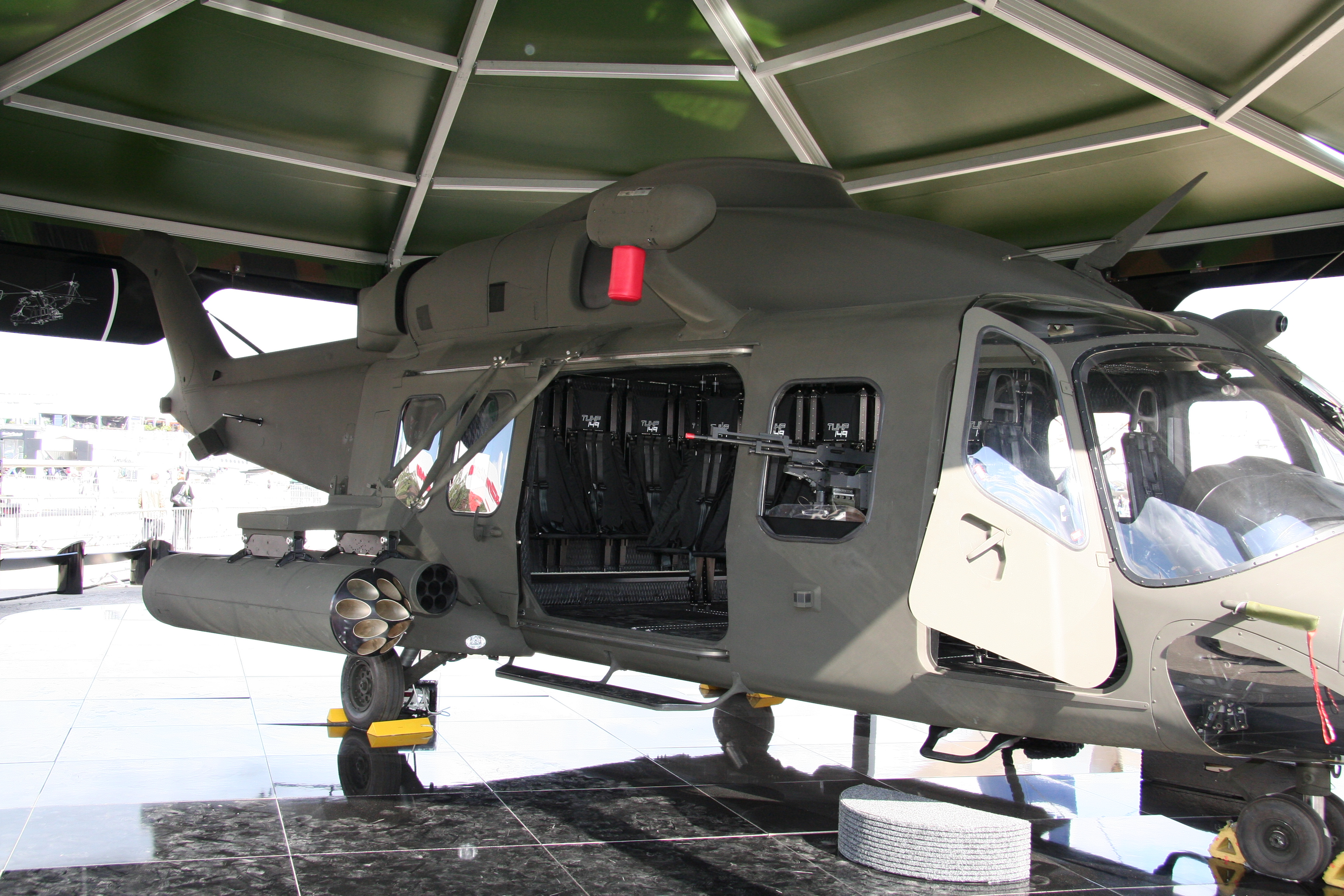
Armed version at the 2009 Paris Air Show. Two different types of rocket pods are visible

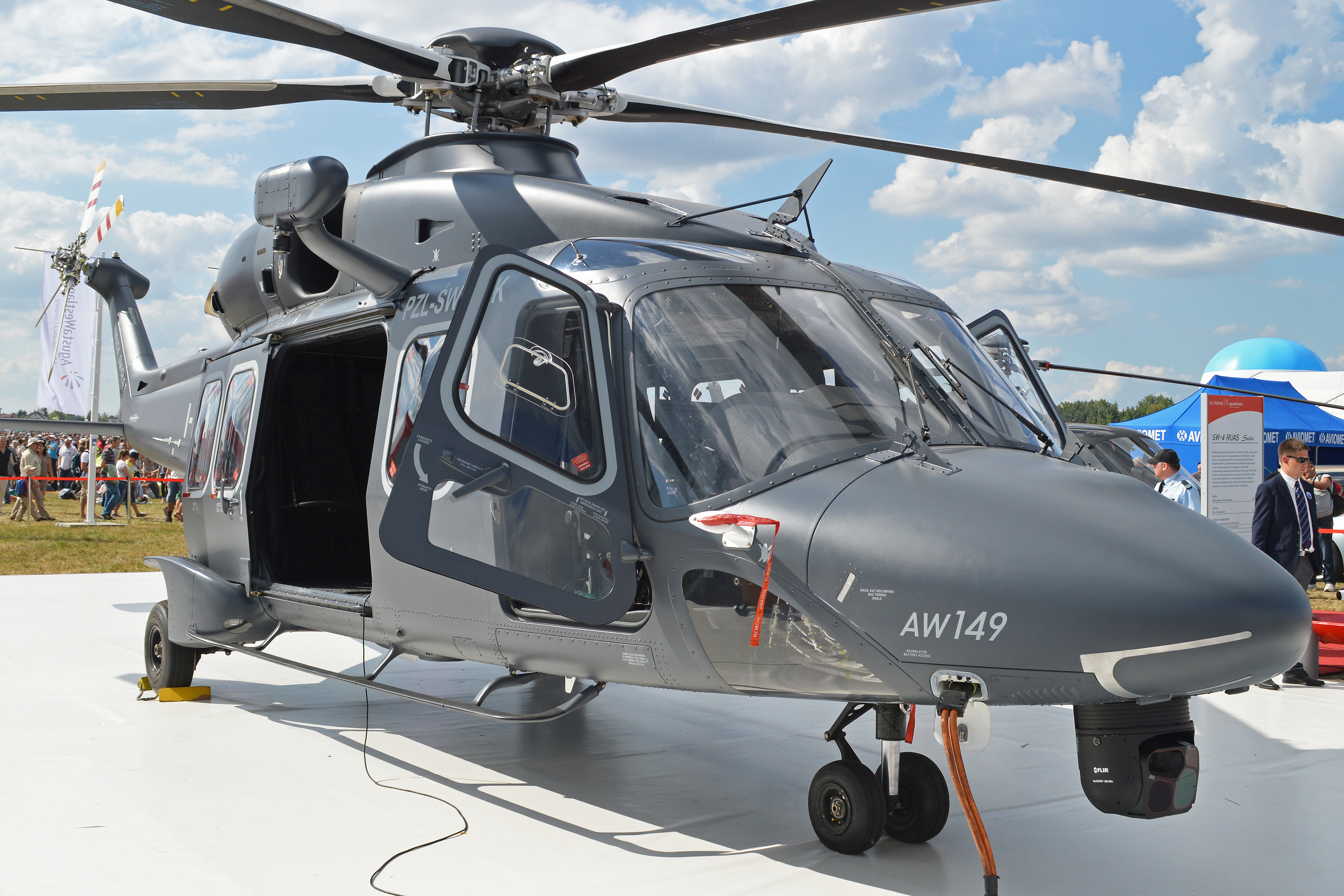
AW149 on display at Radom Airbase Air Show in 2013

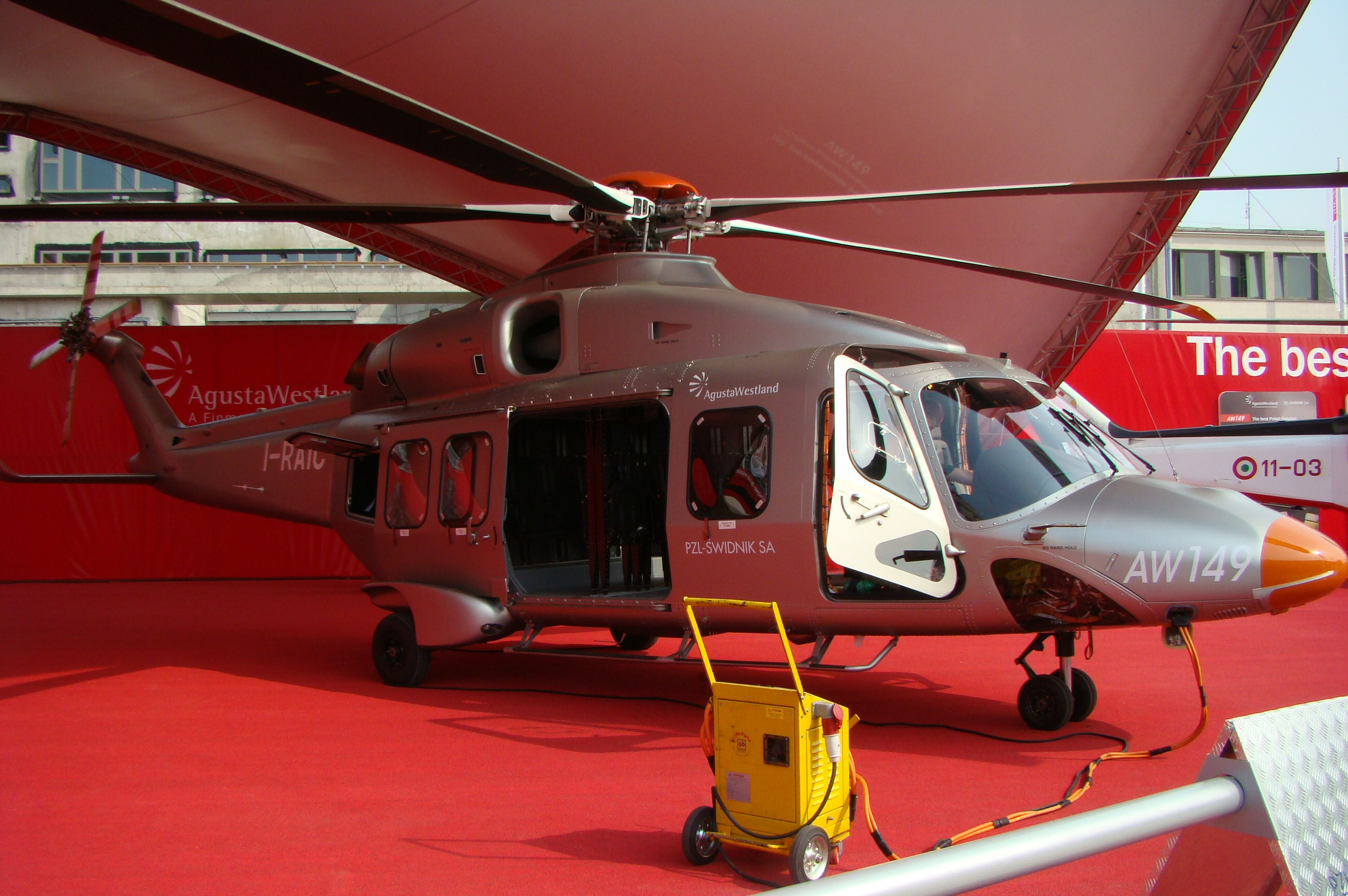
On display at MSPO 2012

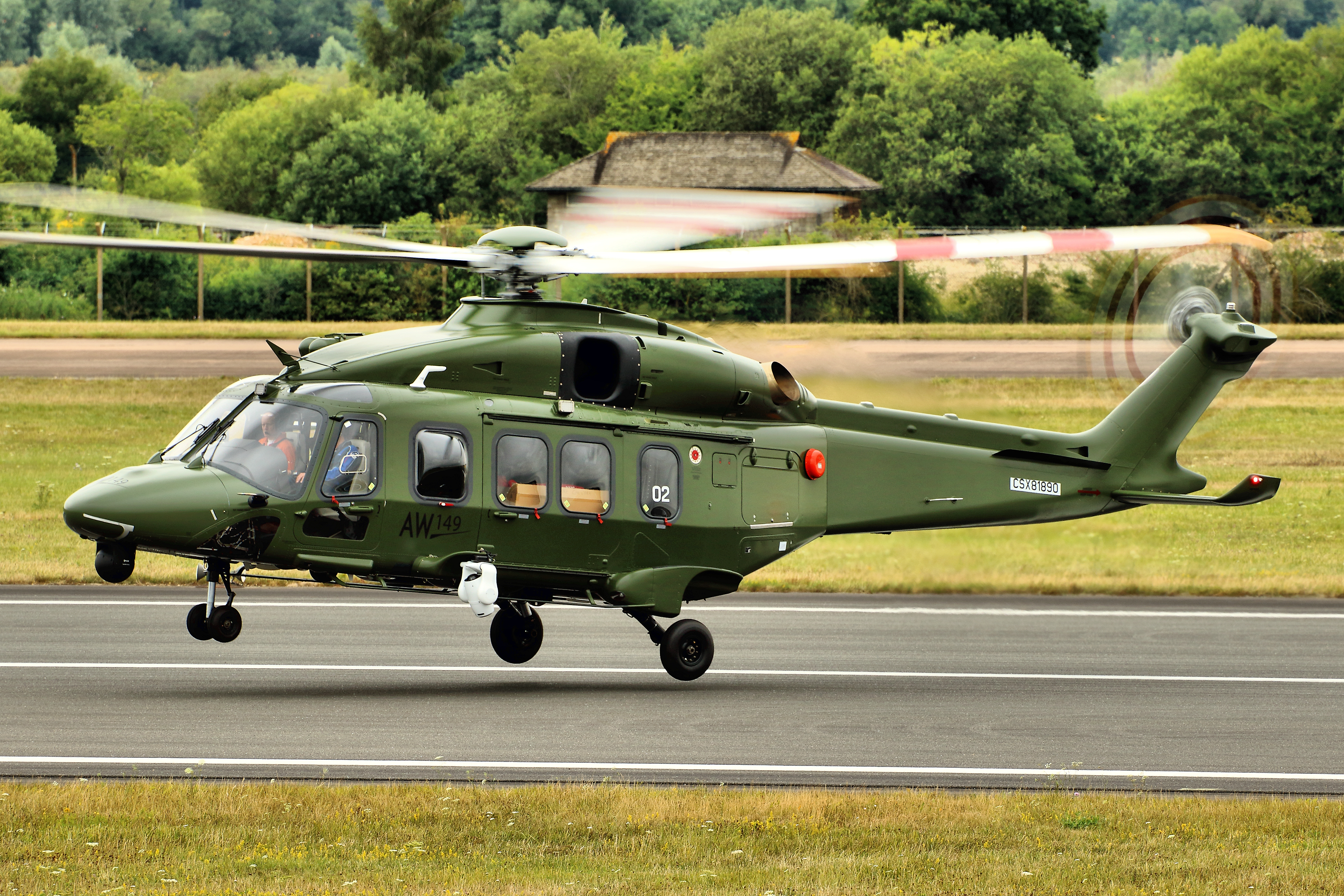
AW149 at RIAT 2015

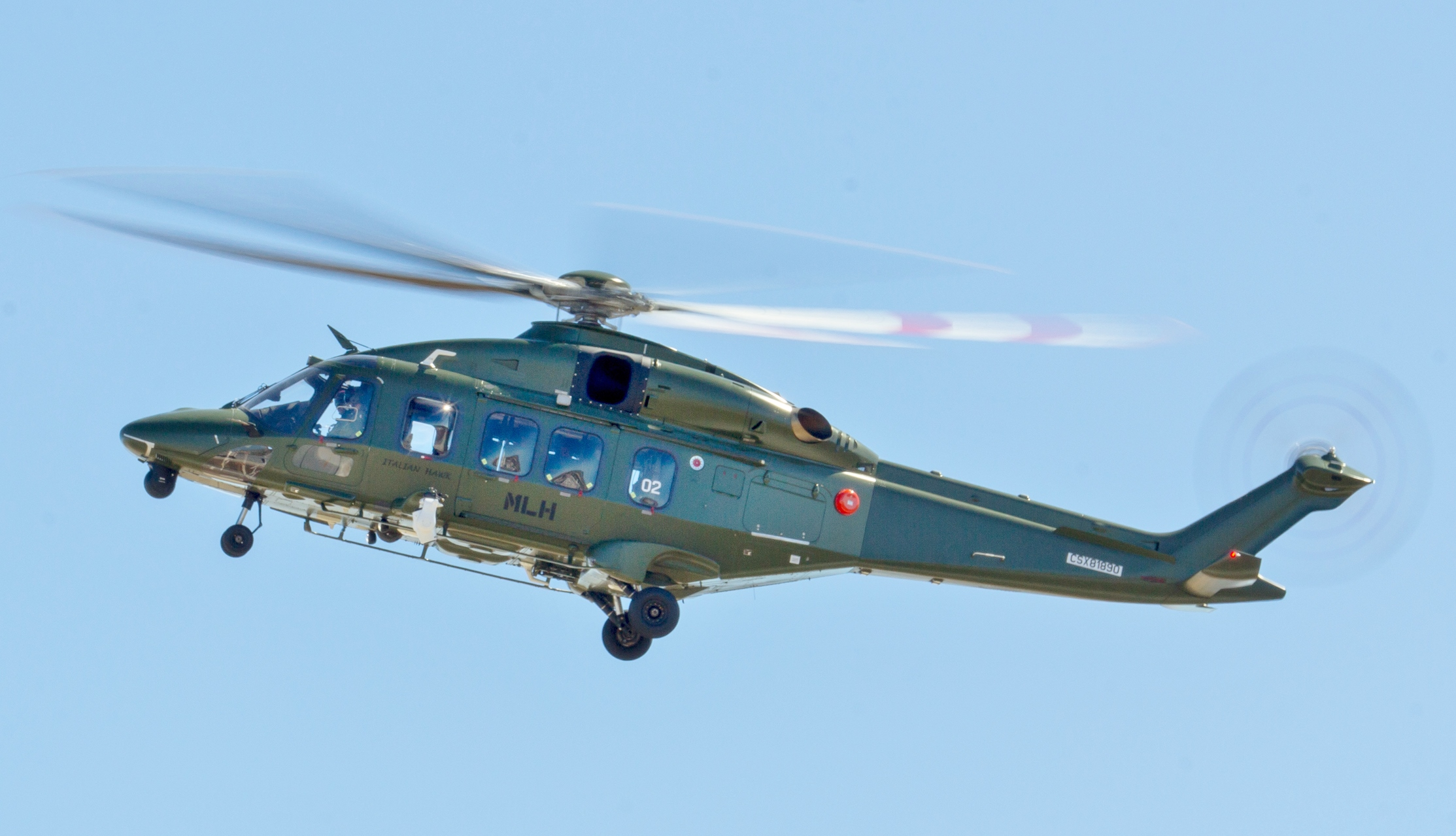
AW149 at the 2015 Malta International Airshow

=== Military operators ===
==== Current operators ====
Egypt
Egyptian Navy (24 ordered in 2019 with options for 10 more; 5 delivered in 2020, 5 delivered in 2021)

Poland
Polish Army (32 ordered in 2022, delivery planned from 2023 to 2029, 3 delivered in 2023, 5 delivered in 2024, 5 delivered in 2025)

Thailand
Royal Thai Army (5 in service)

==== Future operators ====
Malaysia
Malaysian Army - 4 on order.

Royal Malaysian Air Force - 12 on order under 28 hire-purchase lease helicopter agreement by Weststar Aviation.

North Macedonia
Air Force of North Macedonia (4 AW149s on order)

United Kingdom

Royal Air Force - 23 AW149s have been ordered under the New Medium Helicopter (NMH) programme.

=== Civilian operators ===
==== Current operators ====
Thailand
Royal Thai Police (1 in service)

== Specifications (AW149) ==
Data from AgustaWestland

General characteristics

- Crew: 2
- Capacity: 19 troops with light equipment, 16 combat laden troops
- Length: 17.57 m (57 ft 8 in)
- Diameter: 14.60 m (47 ft 11 in)
- Width: 3.06 m (0 in)
- Height: 5.14 m (16 ft 10 in)
- Volume: 11.2 m^{3} (400 cu ft) for the cab, 2.4 m^{3} (85 ft^{3}) for stowage
- Max takeoff weight: 8,600 kg (18,960 lb)
- Useful lift: 3,880 kg (8,550 lb) useful load, 2,800 kg (6,200 lb) for the cargo hook
- Powerplant: 2 × Safran Aneto-1K , 1,715 kW (2,300 hp) each Maximum continuous power
- Powerplant: 2 × General Electric CT7-2E1 , 1,479 kW (1,983 hp) each take-off power, 1,395 kW (1,871 shp) of maximum continuous power
- Main rotor diameter: 14.6 m (47 ft 11 in)

Performance

- Maximum speed: 310 km/h (190 mph, 170 kn)
- Cruise speed: 278 km/h (173 mph, 150 kn)
- Range: 1,009 km (627 mi, 545 nmi)
- Endurance: five hours and five minutes
- Service ceiling: 4,600 m (15,000 ft) (1,770 m (5,810 ft) hovering ceiling)

Armament

- Hardpoints: four, with the following combinations:
- two missile launching pods with two rocket launching pods
- four rocket launching pods
- two fuel tanks
- Rockets: FZ231 pod with 12 × 70 mm rocket
- Missiles: a multi-launcher pod capable of 4 × AGM-114 Hellfire II

Avionics
Open architecture

== See also ==
Related development

- AgustaWestland AW139
- AgustaWestland AW189
- Leonardo Helicopters AW249

Aircraft of comparable role, configuration, and era

- Airbus Helicopters H175
- Bell 525 Relentless
- Harbin Z-20
- KAI KUH-1 Surion
- NHIndustries NH90
- Sikorsky UH-60 Black Hawk

Related lists

- List of rotorcraft
