= Z17/18 Beijing–Harbin through train =

Railway service in China

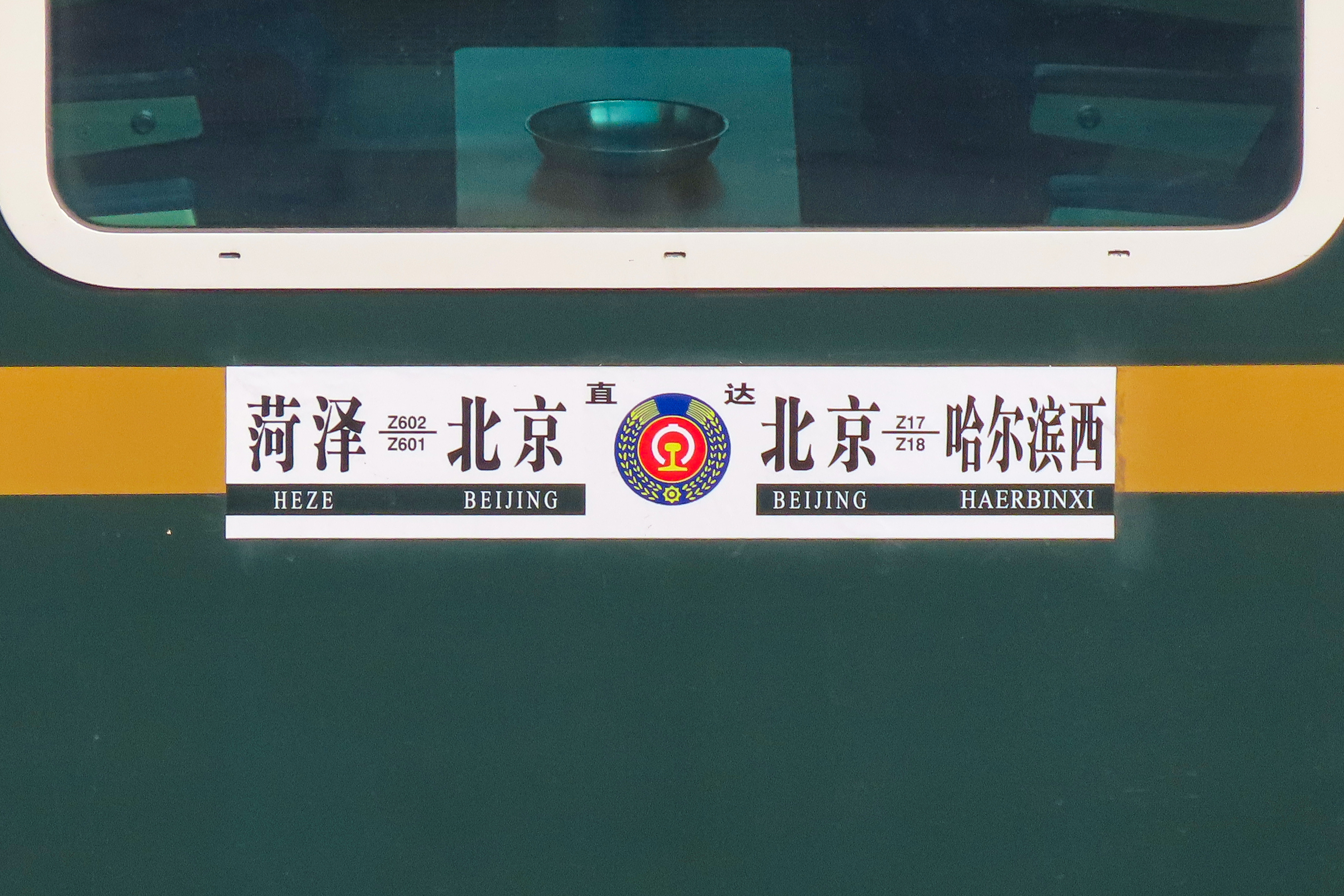
- Destination board of the train as of October 2023

Overview
- Service type: Non-stop Express
- Status: Operating
- Locale: Beijing, Harbin
- First service: 30 December 2009; 15 years ago
- Current operator: Harbin Railway Bureau

Route
- Termini: Beijing railway station Harbin railway station
- Distance travelled: 1,249 km (776 mi)
- Average journey time: 10 hours, 06 minutes
- Service frequency: Daily each way

On-board services
- Classes: Hard sleeper, soft sleeper

The Z17/18 Beijing–Harbin through train is a non-stop express train between Beijing and Harbin, capital of the Heilongjiang province, operated by Harbin Railway Bureau using 25T carriages. The 1242 km journey spans across almost the entire Beijing–Harbin railway. The train from Beijing railway station to Harbin West railway station is numbered Z17, with a journey time of 9 hours and 57 minutes; while the train in the opposite direction is numbered Z18, with a journey time of 10 hours and 15 minutes. It is also the second non-stop express train between Beijing and Harbin, after Z15/16.

== Launch and development ==
The train numbers Z17/18 were initially used on a route from Beijing to Changsha, which started service on 18 April 2004. This train was extended to Tianjin in 2015 and renumbered as Z206/7 and Z208/5.

In 2009, the only night trains between Harbin and Beijing were Z15/16 and T17/18, both facing high demand. As such, an additional pair of non-stop express train, numbered as Z1/2, was introduced in end 2009. One way journey took around 9 hours and 50 minutes. The train formation included 8 soft sleeper and 6 hard sleeper carriages, but this was changed to a full soft sleeper formation in 2010.

In 2016, the train swapped formation with Z203/4, another non-stop express train between Beijing and the province of Heilongjiang, giving its current formation mostly hard sleeper carriages. It was also renumbered as Z17/18.

In 2017, the train was amended to originate from and terminate at Harbin West railway station, as Harbin railway station undergoes renovation works.

== Carriages ==
Currently, the train operates with mostly hard sleeper carriages, with a few soft sleeper carriages.

Carriage number	1-8	9-10	11-18
Type	YW25T; Hard sleeper (Chinese: 硬卧车)	RW25T; Soft sleeper (Chinese: 软卧车)	YW25T; Hard sleeper (Chinese: 硬卧车)

== Locomotive ==
After swapping formation with Z203/4, the HXD3D electric locomotive is utilised throughout the entire journey, with a stop at Shenyang North railway station for a change of drivers.

Section of journey	Beijing－Harbin West
Locomotive utilised	China Railways HXD3D; Shenyang Railway Bureau Shenyang Depot (Chinese: 沈阳铁路局沈阳客运段)

== Schedule ==
Updated as of 10 April 2018.

Z17		Stops	Z18	
Arrive	Depart	Stops	Arrive	Depart
—	21:15	Beijing	07:49	—
07:12	—	Harbin West	—	21:34

== See also ==
- Z15/16 Beijing–Harbin through train
- Z203/204 Beijing–Harbin through train
- D27/28 Beijing–Harbin through train
- G381/382 Beijing–Harbin through train
- G393/394 Beijing–Harbin through train
