= Z203/204 Beijing–Harbin through train =

Railway service in China

The Z203/204 Beijing–Harbin through train (Chinese:Z203/204次北京到哈尔滨直达特快列车) is a Chinese railway running between the capital Beijing to Harbin, capital of Heilongjiang express passenger trains by the Beijing Railway Bureau, Harbin passenger segment responsible for passenger transport task, Harbin originating on the Beijing train. 25T Type Passenger trains running along the Jingha Railway across Heilongjiang, Jilin, Liaoning, Hebei, Tianjin, Beijing and other provinces and cities, the entire 1249 km. Beijing railway station to Harbin railway station running 10 hours and 48 minutes, use trips for Z203; Harbin railway station to Beijing railway station to run 11 hours and 16 minutes, use trips for Z204.

== See also ==
- Z15/16 Beijing–Harbin through train
- Z17/18 Beijing–Harbin through train
- D27/28 Beijing–Harbin through train
- G381/382 Beijing–Harbin through train
- G393/394 Beijing–Harbin through train
