= D27/28 Beijing–Harbin through train =

Railway service in China

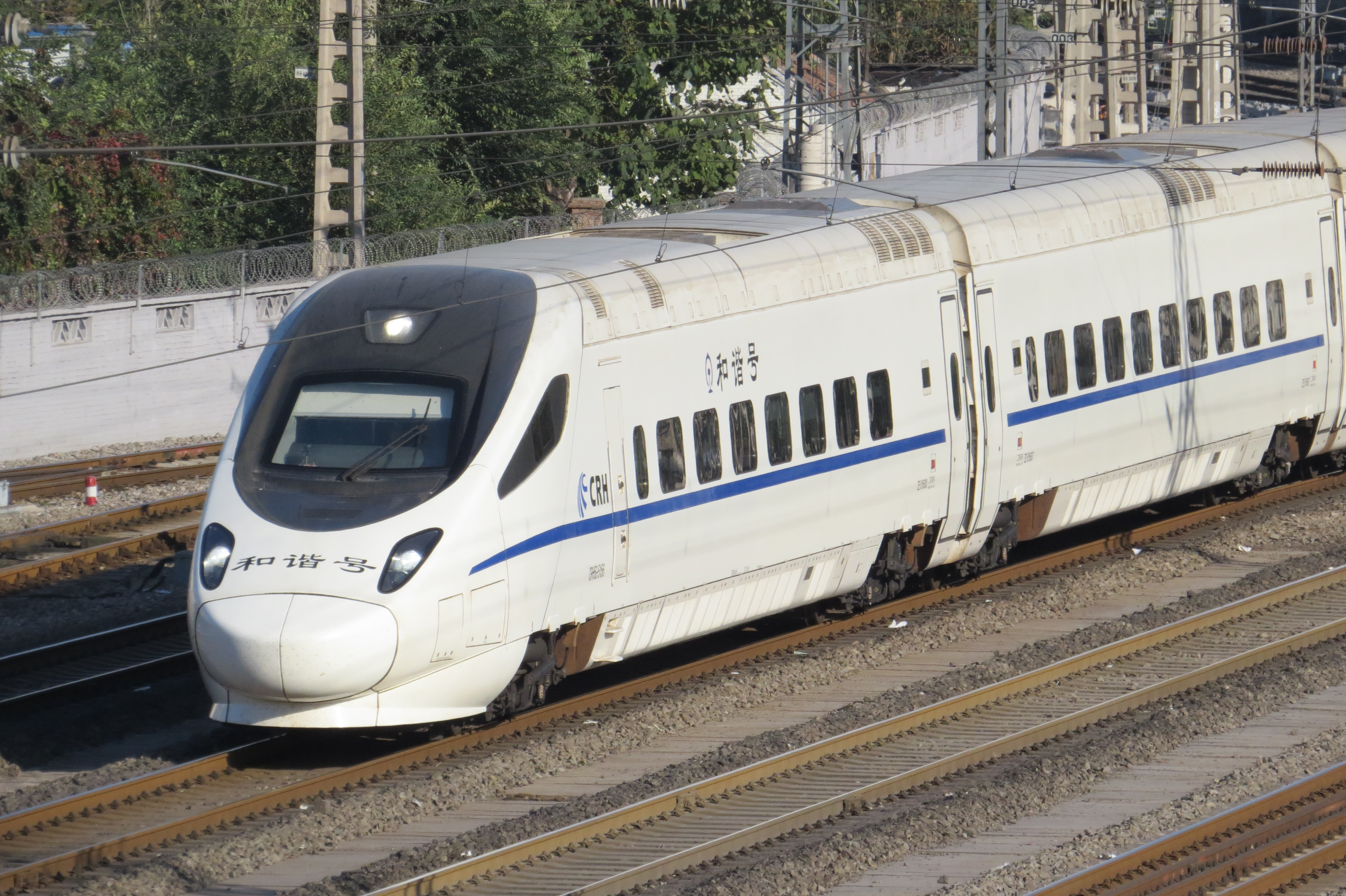
A CRH5G entering Beijing railway station as D28.

The D27/28 Beijing–Harbin through train (Chinese:D27/28次北京到哈尔滨西动车组列车) is a Chinese railway running between the capital Beijing to Harbin, capital of Heilongjiang express passenger trains by the Harbin Railway Bureau, Harbin passenger segment responsible for passenger transport task, Harbin originating on the Beijing train. The service uses CRH5 trains, which run along the Jingha Railway and Harbin–Dalian High-Speed Railway through Heilongjiang, Jilin, Liaoning, Hebei, Tianjin and Beijing, a total distance of 1241 km. Train D27 runs from Beijing railway station to Harbin West railway station in 7 hours and 43 minutes; train D28 runs from Harbin West railway station to Beijing railway station in 7 hours and 53 minutes.

== See also ==
- Z15/16 Beijing–Harbin through train
- Z17/18 Beijing–Harbin through train
- Z203/204 Beijing–Harbin through train
- G381/382 Beijing–Harbin through train
- G393/394 Beijing–Harbin through train
