= G381/382 Beijing–Harbin through train =

Railway service in China

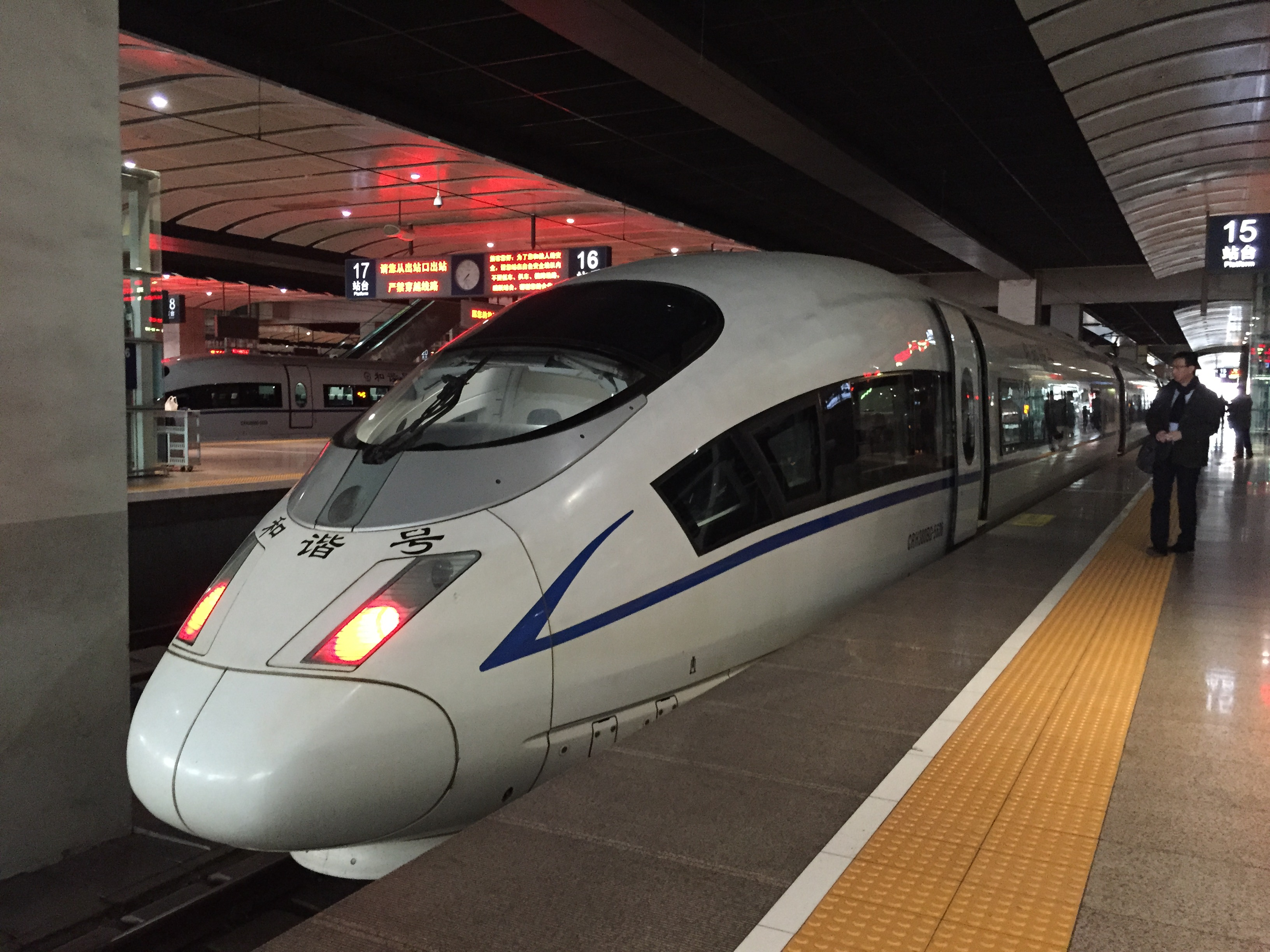
G381 prior to departure at Beijing South railway station.

The G381/382 Beijing–Harbin through train (Chinese: G381/382次北京南到哈尔滨西高速动车组列车) is a Chinese railway running between the capital Beijing to Harbin, capital of Heilongjiang express passenger trains by the Beijing Railway Bureau, Harbin passenger segment responsible for passenger transport task, Harbin originating on the Beijing train. CRH380BG Type Passenger trains running along the Beijing–Shanghai High-Speed Railway, Tianjin–Qinhuangdao High-Speed Railway, Qinhuangdao–Shenyang High-Speed Railway and Harbin–Dalian High-Speed Railway across Heilongjiang, Jilin, Liaoning, Hebei, Tianjin, Beijing and other provinces and cities, the entire 1335 km. Beijing South railway station to Harbin West railway station running 7 hours and 8 minutes, use trips for G381; Harbin West railway station to Beijing South railway station to run 7 hours and 6 minutes, use trips for G382.

== See also ==
- Z1/2 Beijing–Harbin through train
- Z15/16 Beijing–Harbin through train
- Z203/204 Beijing–Harbin through train
- D27/28 Beijing–Harbin through train
- G393/394 Beijing–Harbin through train
