= Z15/16 Beijing–Harbin through train =

Railway service in China

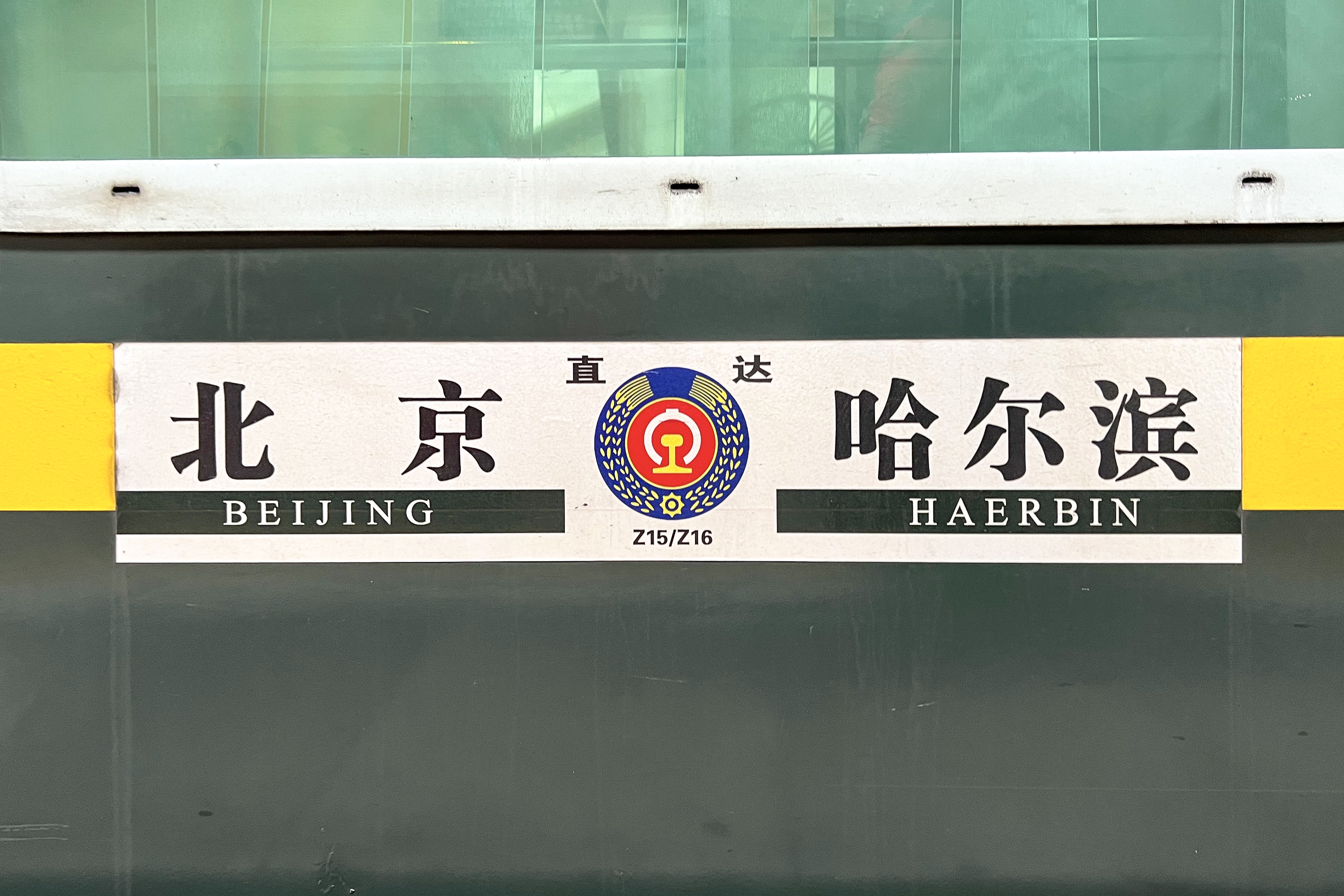

Overview
- Service type: Non-stop Express
- Status: Operating
- Locale: Beijing, Harbin
- First service: 18 April 2004; 21 years ago
- Current operator: Harbin Railway Bureau

Route
- Termini: Beijing railway station Harbin railway station
- Distance travelled: 1,249 km (776 mi)
- Average journey time: 9 hours, 56 minutes
- Service frequency: Daily each way

On-board services
- Classes: Soft sleeper, Luxury soft sleeper
- Catering facilities: Dining car

The Z15/16 Beijing–Harbin through train is a non-stop express train between Beijing and Harbin, capital of the Heilongjiang province, operated by Harbin Railway Bureau using 25T soft sleeper carriages. The 1249 km journey spans across the entire Beijing–Harbin railway. The train from Beijing railway station to Harbin West railway station is numbered Z15, with a journey time of 9 hours and 58 minutes; while the train in the opposite direction is numbered Z16, with a journey time of 9 hours and 54 minutes.

== Launch and development ==
In 2004, as part of the fifth "Speed-Up campaign" by the Ministry of Railways, 19 pairs of non-stop express trains were launched, most of them along the Beijing-Harbin Railway and Beijing-Shanghai Railway. These trains would depart at night and arrive at the terminus the next morning. Among them were the Z15/16 Beijing–Harbin through train, operated by Harbin Railway Bureau. At that time, one way journey took 10 hours and 30 minutes, which was further compressed to 9 hours and 44 minutes in 2008. The route was favoured by many passengers, with its load factor reaching 90% just a month after its launch.

In 2017, the route was amended to originate from and terminate at Harbin West railway station, as Harbin railway station undergoes renovation works.

== Carriages ==
Currently, the route uses 25T soft sleeper carriages built by Bombardier Sifang Power (Qingdao) Transportation Ltd. in 2003, with a power supply mode of AC380V.

| Carriage number | 1-8 | 9 | 10 | 11-18 |
| Type | RW25T; Soft sleeper (Chinese: 软卧车) | CA25T; Dining car (Chinese: 餐车) | RW19T; Luxury Soft Sleeper (Chinese: 高级包厢软卧车) | RW25T; Soft sleeper (Chinese: 软卧车) |

== Locomotive ==
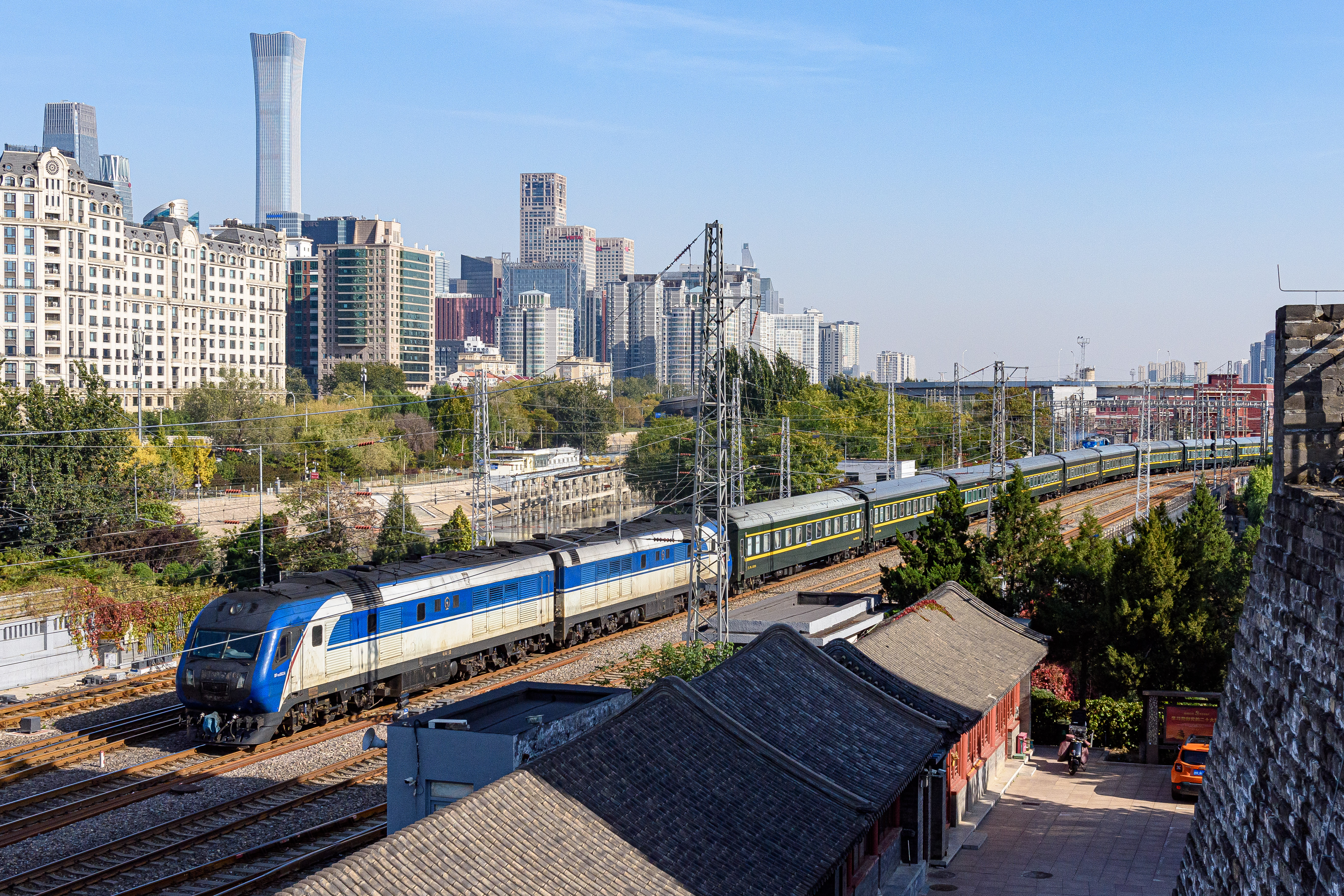
Z16 hauled by DF11G-0024/0023

Due to the unique power supply mode of the carriages, the DF11G diesel locomotive is utilised throughout the entire journey, with a technical stop at Shenyang North railway station for a change of drivers.

| Section of journey | Beijing－Harbin West |
| Locomotive utilised | DF11G diesel locomotive Harbin Railway Bureau Sankeshu Depot (Chinese: 哈尔滨铁路局三棵树机务段) |

== Schedule ==
Updated as of 10 April 2018.

| Z15 | | Stops | Z16 | |
| Arrive | Depart | Stops | Arrive | Depart |
|---|---|---|---|---|
| — | 21:21 | Beijing | 07:21 | — |
| 07:19 | — | Harbin West | — | 21:27 |

== See also ==
- Z17/18 Beijing–Harbin through train
- Z203/204 Beijing–Harbin through train
- D27/28 Beijing–Harbin through train
- G381/382 Beijing–Harbin through train
- G393/394 Beijing–Harbin through train
