= Bell 525 Relentless =

American medium-lift helicopter

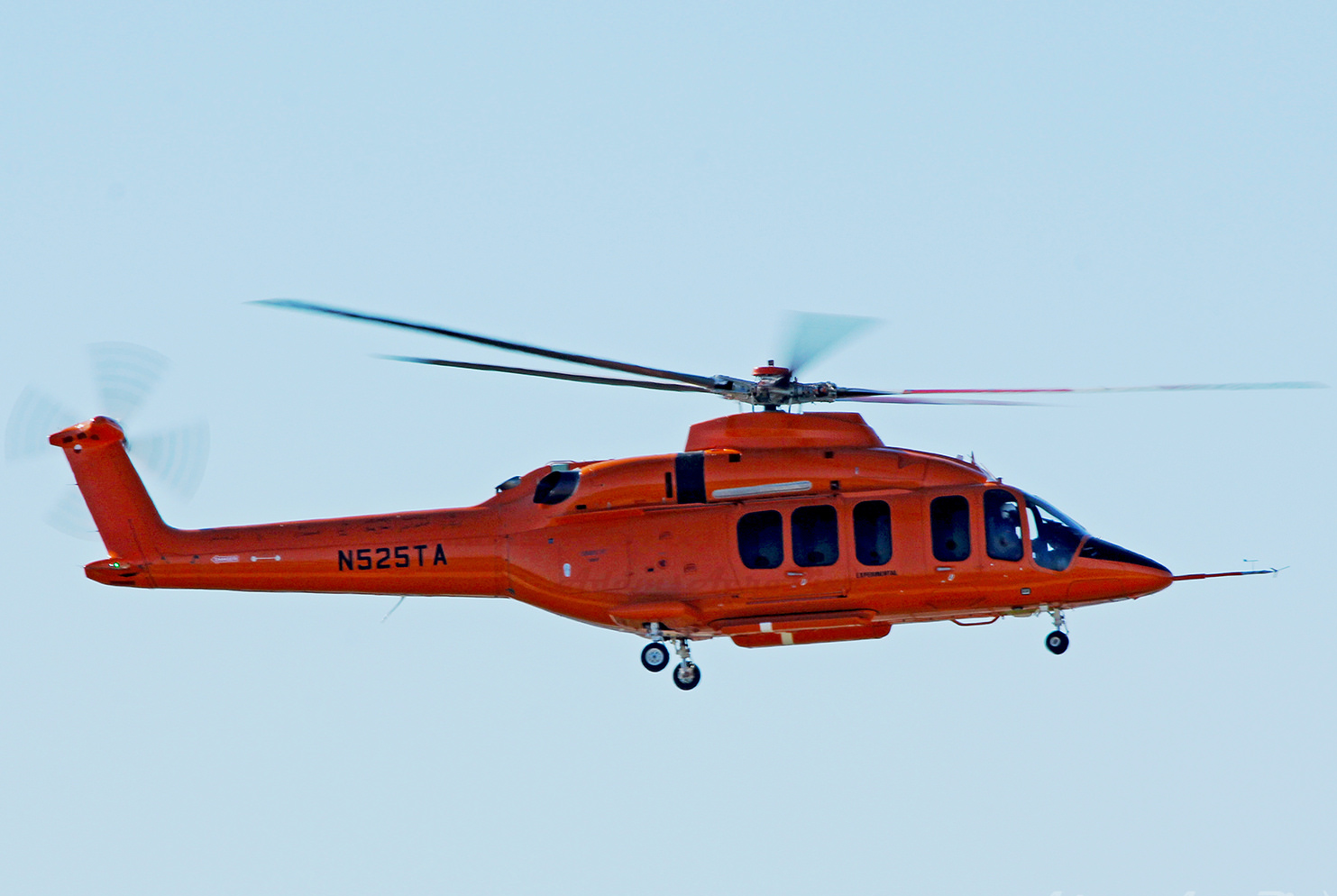
- Prototype of the Bell 525 in flight

General information
- Type: Super-medium-lift utility helicopter
- National origin: United States
- Manufacturer: Bell Textron
- Status: Under development

History
- Manufactured: 2015–present
- First flight: 1 July 2015

The Bell 525 Relentless is an American super-medium-lift helicopter, under development by Bell Textron. The new model was unveiled at the 2012 Heli-Expo in Dallas, Texas in February 2012. It first flew on 1 July 2015.

The Bell 525 is designed to transport up to 19 passengers. The aircraft is the first fly-by-wire civilian aircraft and suffered a crash of its prototype, and is still slowly working towards certification. As of 2024, Bell is working towards completing flight certification, and it has secured its first order.

It is a twin turbine engine helicopter with a composite and metal airframe that is in the latter stages of its development.

== Development ==
Bell's first new project after the Bell 429 and Bell V-22 was the super medium Bell 525, previously known as Project X or Magellan. The helicopter is designed for trips of 50 to 500 nautical miles, and has a 5-blade main rotor powered by twin engines, including digital controls and a Garmin G5000H screen, with planned seating for 16-20 people. The flight software is intended to have features that enable single-pilot operation of the helicopter.

The Bell 525's maiden flight was planned for late 2014. PHI, Inc. was the launch customer for the type, but as of 2016 is no longer the launch customer. After a six-month delay, the Bell 525 prototype first flew in July 2015. At that time, Bell predicted certification to be completed by the end of 2017. The FAA suggested special rules in May 2016, to address the fly-by-wire concept.

=== July 2016 crash ===
At approximately 11:48 AM Central Daylight Time on July 6, 2016, the prototype crashed during a test flight near Italy, Texas, killing the two occupants. The aircraft, registration N525TA, broke up in flight while traveling about 229 mph (369 km/h; 199 kn) at an altitude of about 2,000 feet (600 m). During flight testing of the prototype, a severe vibration in the main rotor led to a sequence of events causing the break up of the aircraft. An oscillation in the main rotors of scissoring type caused a 6 hertz vibration in the airfame, which led to a bio-mechanical feedback loop transmitted from the pilot seat to the pilot and controls among other issues. The accident happened during simulated one engine out test, that used special software to lower the output of both engines. There are many other aspects to conditions that led to the accident.

The crash delayed the expected certification beyond 2017. In February 2018, Bell predicted certification to be completed by late 2018 or early 2019. In December 2018, 1,300 hours of turn time and 900 hr of flight were accumulated, towards a 2019 US type certification. In early 2019, two helicopters were to be tested in cold weather in Yellowknife, Northwest Territories, Canada, as a third prototype was to validate performance in snowy north continental US.

Bell has worked with the FAA to work towards certifying the new design, and examples of tests include running simulated icing conditions.

=== Intended market ===
The helicopter is the largest civilian helicopter made yet by Bell, and can carry 16 passengers and two crew.

Bell has also pitched the Bell 525 to military customers as a 20-passenger utility and troop transport or search and rescue (SAR) aircraft. Bell sought to sell the 525 to the United Kingdom for its New Medium Helicopter program, which aims to replace the RAF's Puma (SA330) helicopters, but Bell's proposal did not make it past the pre-qualification questionnaire stage for the UK's medium lift programme.

In 2019, Bell displayed the Bell 525 at the Paris Air Show, updating the market on its progress and demonstrating some of the aircraft systems.

In 2024, Bell announced its first customer for the Bell 525. Norwegian oil company Equinor placed an order for ten. They are expected to operate in the North Sea offshore market and be delivered in the late 2020s. The customer noted its thirty–year relationship with Bell and its products. In March 2025, Bell stated that certification of the 525 was nearing.

== Design ==
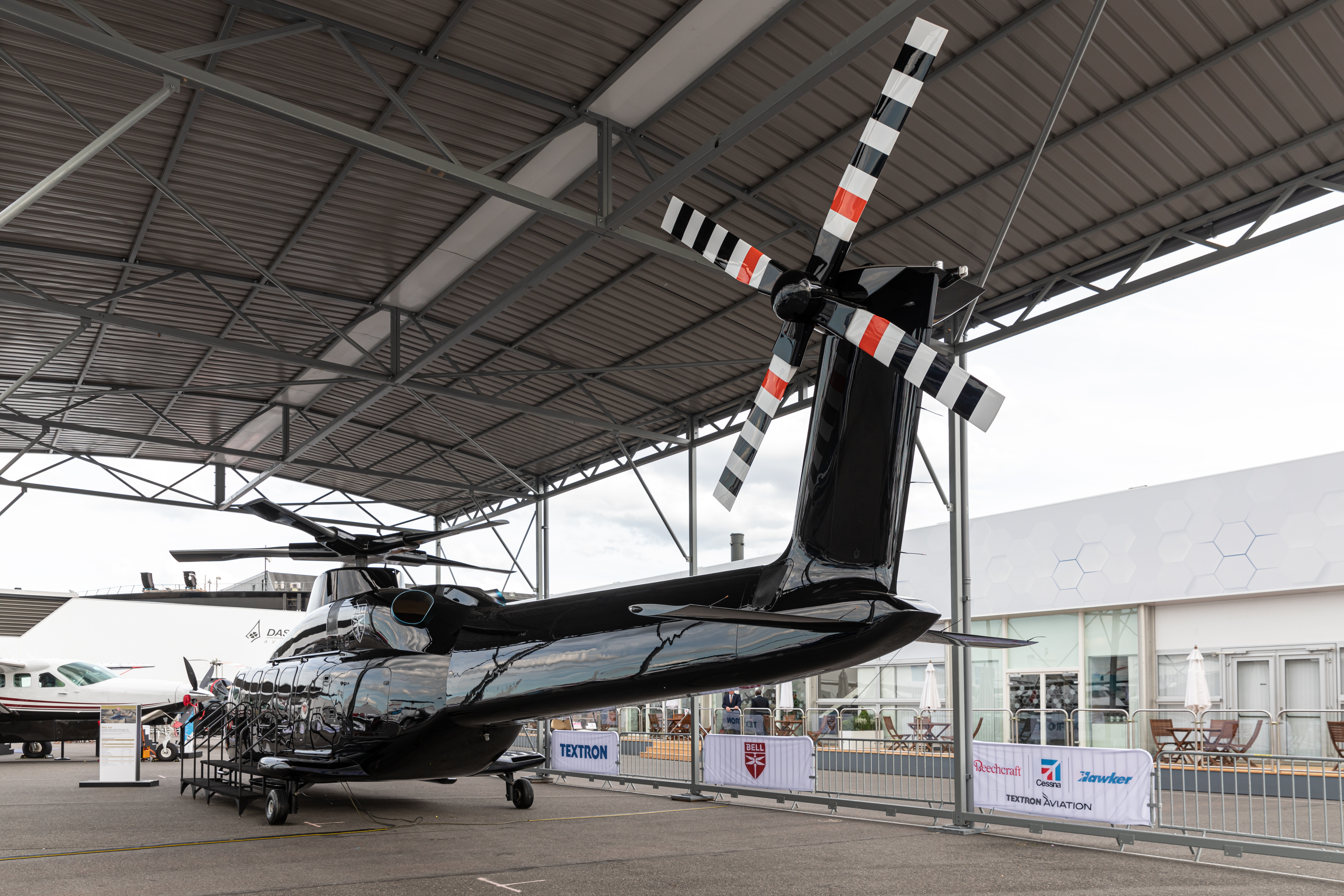
Bell 525 on display at the Paris Air Show of 2019

The Bell 525 is designed to meet a requirement for a medium-lift helicopter. It will be constructed primarily from composites and metal and is to be the first commercial helicopter to incorporate fly-by-wire flight controls, with tactile cues. The system is triple redundant, and is developed in two simulator environments. The 525 is powered by a pair of GE CT7-2F1 turboshaft engines, with a new composite five-blade main rotor system. The cost of the 525 has not yet been determined, but it is expected to be cost competitive on missions between 50 and 400 nmi, performed by helicopters such as the AgustaWestland AW139 and Sikorsky S-92.

The Bell 525 is designed to fit the emerging "Super-Medium" size category suited ideally to support offshore oil and gas operations. Half of the customers come from that sector. Helicopters under development in the same class are the Airbus Helicopters H175 and the AgustaWestland AW189. The 525 is to be certified in Category A Takeoff class, at maximum gross weight. This involves being able to continue a takeoff (or landing) after one of the helicopter's two turbine engines fails at any point. It should be capable of carrying 19 passengers, more than any existing super-medium helicopter. It is designed for two pilots with 16 passengers in the standard configuration and two pilots with 20 passengers in high-density seating.

== Specifications (Bell 525) ==
Data from "Bell 525", Flight Global

General characteristics

- Crew: one or two
- Capacity: 16 or 20 passengers
  8,200 pounds (3,700 kg) useful load
- Gross weight: 20,500 lb (9,300 kg)
- Max takeoff weight: 20,500 lb (9,300 kg)
- Fuel capacity: 2,461 liters (541 imp gal; 650 U.S. gal)
- Powerplant: 2 × General Electric CT7-2F1 turboshaft, 1,800 shp (1,300 kW) each
- Main rotor diameter: 54 ft 6 in (16.61 m)

Performance

- Maximum speed: 190 mph (306 km/h, 165 kn)
- Cruise speed: 178 mph (287 km/h, 155 kn)
- Range: 644 mi (1,037 km, 560 nmi) Max GW, Sea Level, ISA, standard fuel, no reserve, VLRC
- Service ceiling: 20,000 ft (6,100 m) with 12,000 ft (3,700 m) hover in ground effect, 6,000 ft (1,800 m) HOGE

Avionics

- Garmin G5000H

== See also ==
- Bell 214ST

Related development

- Bell 360 Invictus

Aircraft of comparable role, configuration, and era

- AgustaWestland AW189
- Airbus Helicopters H175
- Harbin Z-20
- KAI KUH-1 Surion
- NHIndustries NH90
- Sikorsky S-70
