= Yeovil/Westland Airport =

Yeovil Aerodrome
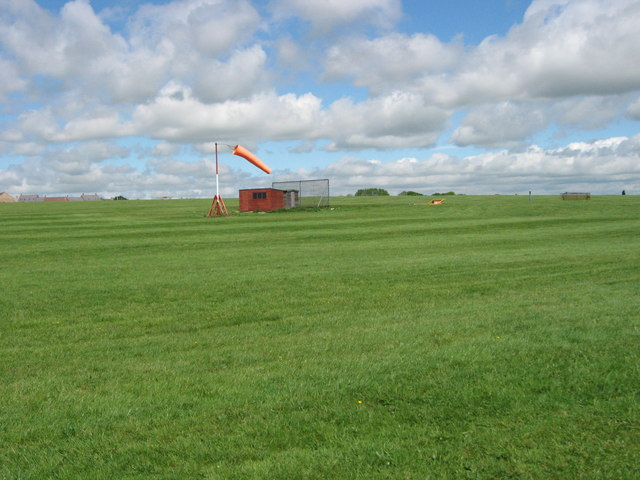
- IATA: none; ICAO: EGHG

Summary
- Airport type: Private
- Operator: Leonardo
- Location: Yeovil, Somerset, England
- Elevation AMSL: 202 ft / 62 m
- Coordinates: 50°56′24″N 002°39′31″W

Map
- Location in Somerset

Runways
Direction	Length		Surface
Direction	m	ft	Surface
09/27	1,182	3,878	Grass
- Sources: UK AIP at NATS

Yeovil Aerodrome (ICAO: EGHG), sometimes known as Yeovil/Westland (to avoid confusion with nearby RNAS Yeovilton), is located in Yeovil, Somerset, England, 1 mile (1.6 kilometres) west of the town centre.

Yeovil Aerodrome has a CAA Ordinary Licence (Number P482) that allows flights for the public transport of passengers or for flying instruction as authorised by the licensee (Westland Helicopters Limited).

== History ==
In 1915 the Westland Aircraft Works was founded as a division of Petters Limited in response to government orders for the construction under licence of initially 12 Short Type 184 seaplanes, followed by 20 Short Type 166 aircraft. The name "Westland" was chosen by Mrs Petter as new land purchased as part of an expansion in 1913 at West Hendford which had been earmarked for a new foundry, but ended up becoming the centre for aircraft production. Initially these were seaplanes dispatched in crates, but for landplanes a runway was needed so that they could fly out to where they were needed and therefore more land was purchased next to the factory. Orders for other aircraft followed during the First World War, including the Sopwith 1½ Strutter, the de Havilland designed Airco DH.4, Airco DH.9 and Airco DH.9A and the Vickers Vimy. For the Vimy the company built a new erecting shop which had an unsupported roof span of 140 ft (43 m), at the time the largest building of its kind in Britain. As a result of the experience gained in manufacturing aircraft under licence, Westland began to design and build its own aircraft, starting with the Westland N.1B in 1917, which was followed in 1918 by the Wagtail and the Weasel.

Before the Second World War, Lysanders and Hawker Hectors were built at the site and flew from the airstrip, and after the start of the war the Whirlwind, Welkin, Spitfires and Wyvern followed. The airfield was also used for repair and servicing for a range of aircraft. Despite the airfield being camouflaged it was bombed on several occasions by the Luftwaffe.

After the war, fixed wing aircraft production was scaled back and the site specialised in helicopters, which can still be seen on test and evaluation flights.
