= Eurocopter EC225 Super Puma =

Largest Civilian Rotorcraft Manufactured by Airbus Helicopters

H225
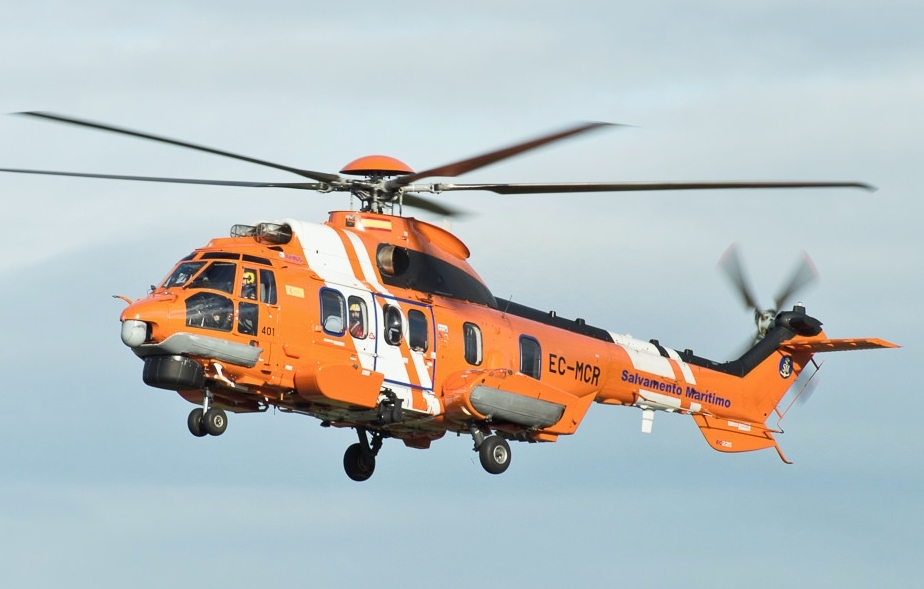
- A Spanish Maritime Safety Agency EC225 at A Coruña Airport

General information
- Type: Passenger transport helicopter
- National origin: Multinational
- Manufacturer: Eurocopter; Airbus Helicopters
- Primary user: CHC Helicopter
- Number built: 170+(as of 2016)

History
- Manufactured: 1999–present
- Introduction date: December 2004
- First flight: 27 November 2000
- Developed from: Eurocopter AS332 Super Puma
- Variant: Eurocopter EC725

The Airbus Helicopters H225 (formerly Eurocopter EC225 Super Puma) is a long-range passenger transport helicopter developed by Eurocopter as the next generation of the civilian Super Puma family. It is a twin-engined aircraft and can carry up to 24 passengers along with two crew and a cabin attendant, dependent on customer configuration. The helicopter is marketed for offshore support and VIP passenger transport duties, as well as public service missions.

The civil-orientated EC225 has a military counterpart, which was originally designated as the Eurocopter EC725. In 2015, the EC225 was formally renamed H225, and the EC725 as H225M, in line with Eurocopter's corporate rebranding as Airbus Helicopters.

== Development ==
In the aftermath of the 1973 oil crisis, oil and gas companies began exploration and extraction activities farther offshore, thus creating a long-term need for more capable rotary aircraft. The development of the EC225, an updated version of the AS332 L2 Super Puma, was announced by Eurocopter in June 1998. The principal differences of the EC225 from the preceding AS332 L2 is the adoption of Spheriflex rotor technology, new Turbomeca Makila 2A turboshaft engines, along with a redesigned main gearbox to accommodate the rotor and engine changes. An integrated flight display system was added. Together these changes resulted in higher speeds and passenger comfort, as well as greater flight safety and reduced operating costs.

On 27 November 2000, the first prototype performed its maiden flight. In July 2004, the type received its airworthiness certification from the European Aviation Safety Agency. In December 2015, the H225, a new designation used for the EC225, received certification from the Interstate Aviation Committee of the Commonwealth of Independent States; this made the H225 the first foreign heavy-lift helicopter to become certified in Russia.

In February 2014, Airbus Helicopters announced at Heli-Expo 2014 the development of an improved variant, the EC225e. The EC225e features numerous changes including new avionics systems, such as the TCAS II collision avoidance system, an automatic identification system, and a specialized rig-approach system; it was also intended to feature an improved Turbomeca Makila 2B engine to increase the EC225e's maximum takeoff weight by 550 kg, and an additional fuel tank in the rear baggage compartment to extend its range to 300 nautical miles with up to ten passengers on board. Some, but not all, modifications can be retrofitted onto existing EC225s. In the same announcement, in February 2014, Lease Corporation International said that they had placed a $645 million order for 15 EC225e (along with 6 Airbus Helicopters EC175) helicopters as the launch customer. In February 2016, the Makila 2B engine was dropped from the EC225e as a cost reduction measure, development of the other structural and avionics aspects is proceeding.

In 2015, Airbus Helicopters announced at the Paris Air Show that it had begun development of a clean-sheet successor to the EC225, initially designated Airbus Helicopters X6, but development was stopped in early 2018. The EC225's production line is projected to continue manufacturing activity until at least 2030.

== Design ==
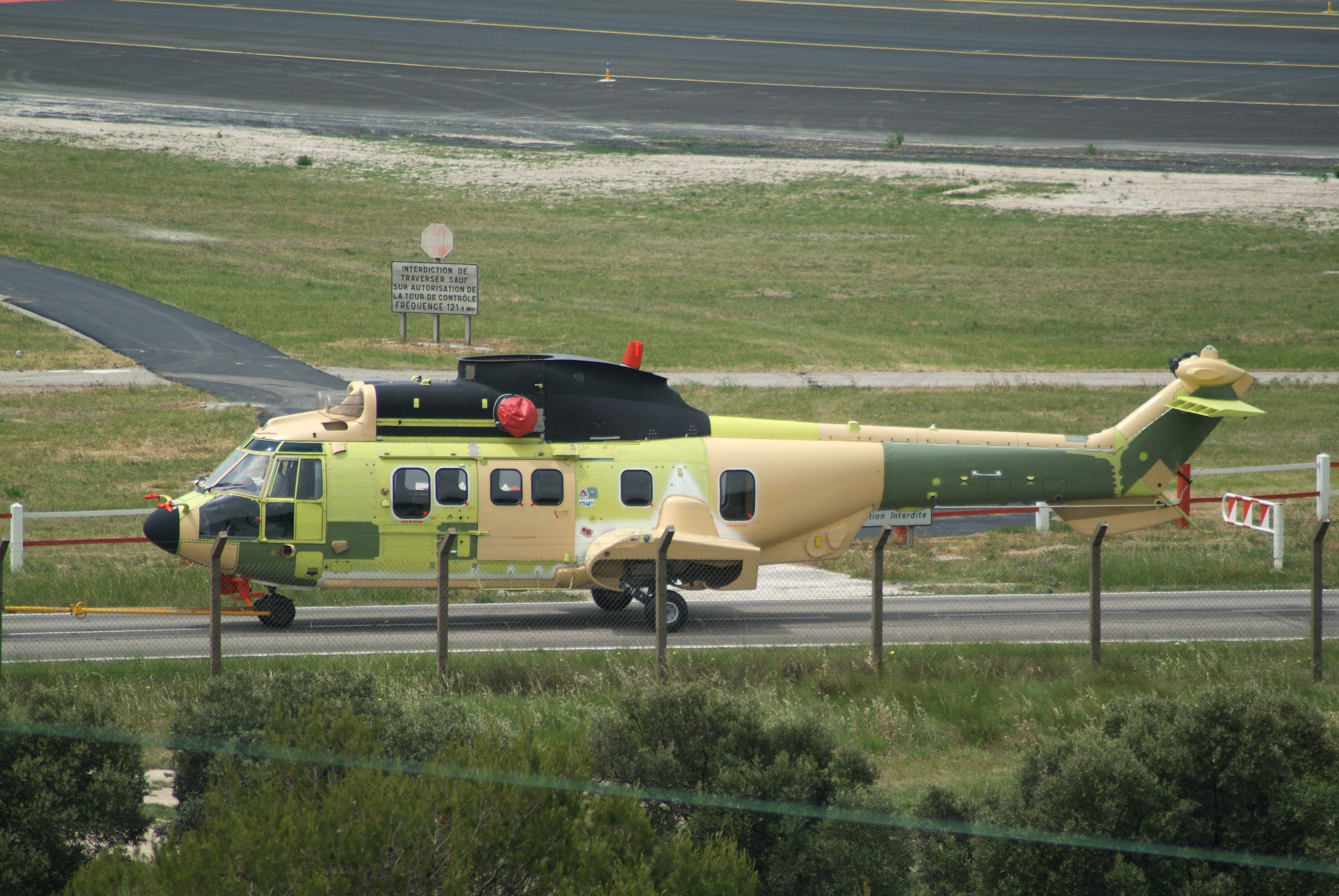
Partially-assembled H225 at Marseille, France, 2007

The H225 is based on the Eurocopter AS332L2 Super Puma, improving upon the design with a five-blade main rotor incorporating a new airfoil shape to reduce vibration and noise levels. The blades of the rotors feature a composite spar and parabolic blade tips; they can also be equipped with an anti-icing system to enable the aircraft to operate within very cold climates. The helicopter is powered by two Turbomeca Makila 2A1 turboshaft engines mounted over the cabin; these engines are capable of providing 14 per cent more engine power and feature a redundant dual-channel full authority digital engine control (FADEC) system for high reliability, a further backup system is present in the event of both FADEC systems failing. The FADEC system ensures that engine power is always kept within the limits of the gearbox. Many of the mechanical components, particularly of the engines, were designed to be modular to ease maintenance, and composite materials were used where possible to reduce the aircraft's weight.

A key safety feature of the aircraft's main gear box (MGB) is an emergency oil spraying sub-system present in the lubrication system; this is designed to exceed the JAR 29 Standard's requirements of a 30-minute running time in the event of the loss of MGB oil pressure, and has demonstrated up to 50-minute running time. The engine also incorporates a "blade shedding" system to ensure engine integrity during an overspeed instance. Energy absorbent self-sealing fuel tanks are contained in the aircraft's sponsons, along with other equipment such as downward-facing illumination and navigation lighting fixtures. The transmission can accommodate more power than the maximum output of the engines; however two aircraft were lost in 2012 due to the cracking of the bevel gear shaft, a gearbox component. In response, the design of the transmission was modified in 2013, and the onboard health and usage monitoring system (HUMS) was upgraded to provide real-time monitoring of the bevel gear shaft against the threat of crack formation.

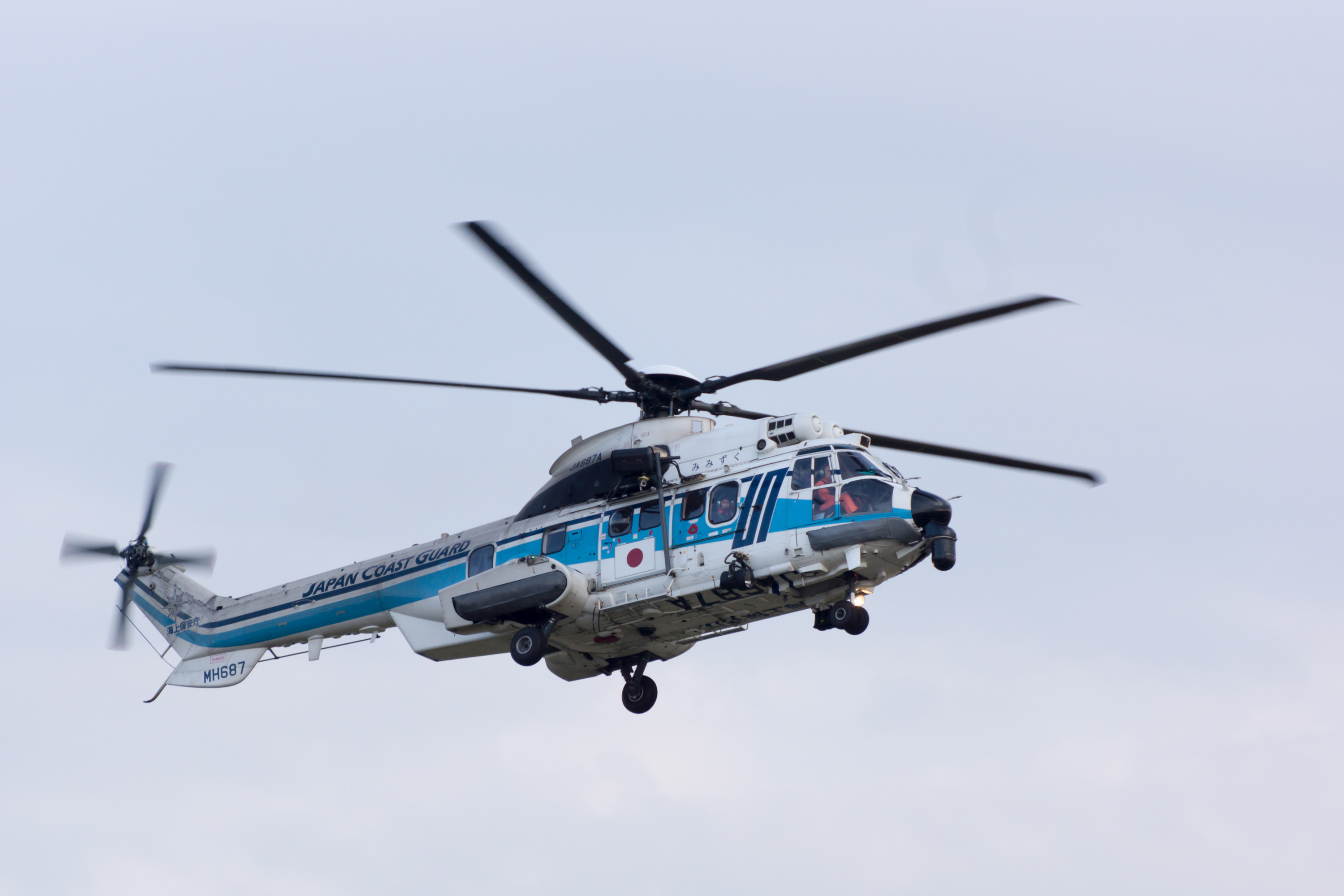
A Japan Coast Guard H225 in flight, Kansai Airport Coast Guard Air Station, 2015

In terms of cockpit equipment and avionics, the H225 is equipped with a full glass cockpit with active-matrix liquid crystal displays; these include four 6-inch by 8-inch multi-functional displays as the predominant instrumentation for key flight information, two 4-inch by 5-inch monitors for displaying aircraft parameters, and a 3-inch screen for backup. The advanced helicopter cockpit and avionics system is described as serving to reduce pilot and crew workload, being used to display flight management and sub-systems information and is complete with a four-axis digital autopilot. During a typical flight, the pilot programs the route into the aircraft and then monitors it, as opposed to direct continuous control of the flight; the need for paper charts has been eliminated by these systems. Under autopilot, the automatic flight control system acts to prevent pilot actions from exceeding the established flight envelope; the H225 remains flyable with all automatic systems disabled. From initiating the startup sequence to being ready to takeoff only takes three minutes.

There are currently a total of four principal configurations designed by Airbus Helicopters for the H225. The passenger transport version has a crash-worthy seating arrangement for up to 19 passengers with a high-density seating arrangement accommodating up to 28 passengers available to be fitted. The VIP transport version has a large lounge with seating for up to 12 passengers and a cabin attendant. The emergency medical services (EMS) configuration has medical units for six stretchers and four seats for medical workers. The search and rescue (SAR) configuration allows space for search and rescue equipment with an operator seat, hoistman seat and up to eight rescue seats and three stretchers. While a single pilot is capable of controlling the aircraft under visual meteorical conditions, two pilots are used in a typical crew complement and, dependent on role, a cabin attendant or flight engineer may also be present.

== Operational history ==
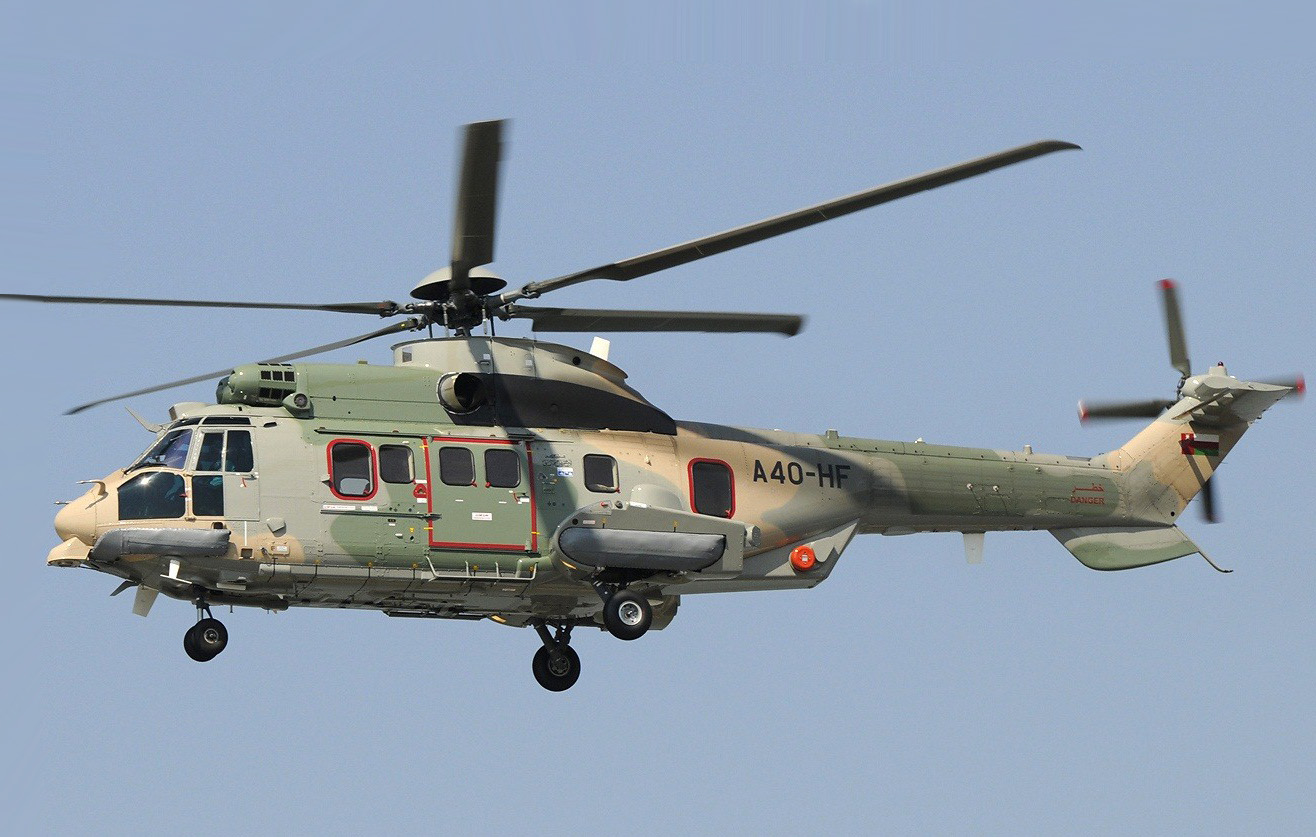
Omani H225 in flight, 2009

In January 2005, Algeria became the first country to use the H225 when the Algerian Ministerial Air Liaisons Group (GLAM) took delivery of a single helicopter for VIP transport duties.

In 2009, the AirKnight consortium offered the H225 in competition against the Sikorsky S-92 offered by the Soteria Search and Rescue consortium for the United Kingdom's Search and Rescue – Helicopter (SAR-H) program to replace the RAF Search and Rescue Force's Westland Sea King fleet. In 2010, Soteria was awarded the contract; however, in 2011 the contract was halted as Soteria had had access to confidential information. In 2013, the Department for Transport awarded Bristow Group the SAR-H contract, operating a mix of Sikorsky S-92 and AgustaWestland AW189.

By 2011, CHC Helicopter had the largest operational fleet of H225s, the type comprising a fifth of the firm's total rotorcraft by 2015. CHC principally use the type for serving the offshore oil and gas industries, as well as search and rescue missions. Another milestone was reached in 2011 when Eurocopter delivered the 100th production H225 to Bristow Group. In March 2013, leasing company Milestone Aviation Group placed a record order for 30 H225s.

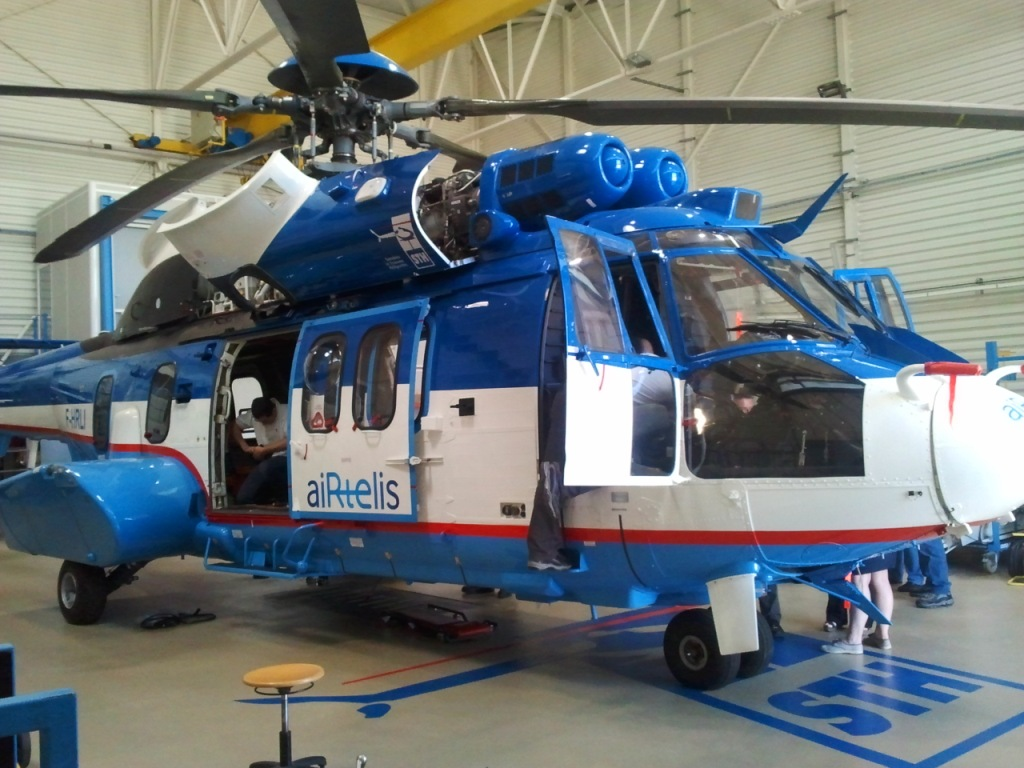
An H225 helicopter in a hangar

Due to its popularity in offshore passenger transport, the H225 is commonly used as an offshore search and rescue aircraft, with operators based in Norway, the UK and Australia. In this role, aircraft are typically equipped with a dual rescue hoist, FLIR camera, high-powered searchlights and an advanced autopilot with autohover capability. The H225 has also been used for aerial firefighting; it can be equipped with a Simplex Aerospace-developed water cannon for dealing with fires in built-up urban areas. Both Japan and South Korea operate several aircraft so adapted.

Following a 22 October 2012 crash, the major North Sea Super Puma operators, CHC Helicopter, Bond Offshore Helicopters and Bristow Helicopters decided to ground all AS332 and H225 Super Puma helicopters. On 25 October 2012 it was announced that the problem was suspected to relate to the main gearbox vertical shaft; the AS 332 L1 and L2 versions of the Super Puma could be refitted with an older design, allowing them to resume flying. On 8 November 2012 some Super Pumas of Bond Offshore Helicopters returned to flight. The H225 grounding continued into 2013. Following the validation of new safety measures by the EASA, the type was progressively returned to service following modifications. By mid-2015, all 49 H225s operating in the North Sea fleets in the UK had been retrofitted with a redesigned bevel wheel vertical shaft to prevent a recurrence.

In March 2015, the Japan Coast Guard accepted delivery of its fifth and final H225. They were outfitted for search and rescue, but would also be used for security enforcement, territorial sea enforcement/monitoring and disaster relief operations.

The H225 was a candidate for the Norwegian All Weather Search and Rescue Helicopter (NAWSARH) to replace the Westland Sea King Mk.43B of the Royal Norwegian Air Force in 2015; other candidates were the AgustaWestland AW101, Bell Boeing V-22 Osprey, NHIndustries NH90 and Sikorsky S-92. By 9 July 2013, only the AW101 and the H225 remained as contenders; in December 2013, the AW101 was selected.

On 2 June 2016, following the crash of an H225 in Norway which revealed a potential safety issue with the main rotor assembly, the EASA issued an emergency airworthiness directive that grounded the H225 fleet; by July 2016, 80 per cent of the worldwide fleet had been grounded, while some operators such as the French military continued to operate the type. In October 2016, the grounding order by the EASA was lifted; some countries, including the United Kingdom and Norway, maintained operational restrictions for the type. Norwegian operator Statoil, which had contracted the CHC H225 which crashed, said that it would not continue using the helicopter even if restrictions were lifted, using the Sikorsky S-92 instead. By December 2016, three lawsuits were filed by H225 operators, claiming that the type had been sold in a defective state due to the flaw being "inherent".

== Variants ==
EC225 LP
An improved variant of the AS332 L2.

EC225 Firefighting
EC225 fitted with internal tanks for water bombing

EC225 SAR
EC225 with FLIR, auto hover & dual electric winches for all-weather search & rescue operations.

EC225e
A version with the newer Turbomeca Makila 2B turboshaft engine.

== Operators ==
Countries operating with Super Pumas. Civilian use Military use

The H225 Super Puma is used for offshore drilling, corporate companies, law enforcement and governments.

=== Military operators ===
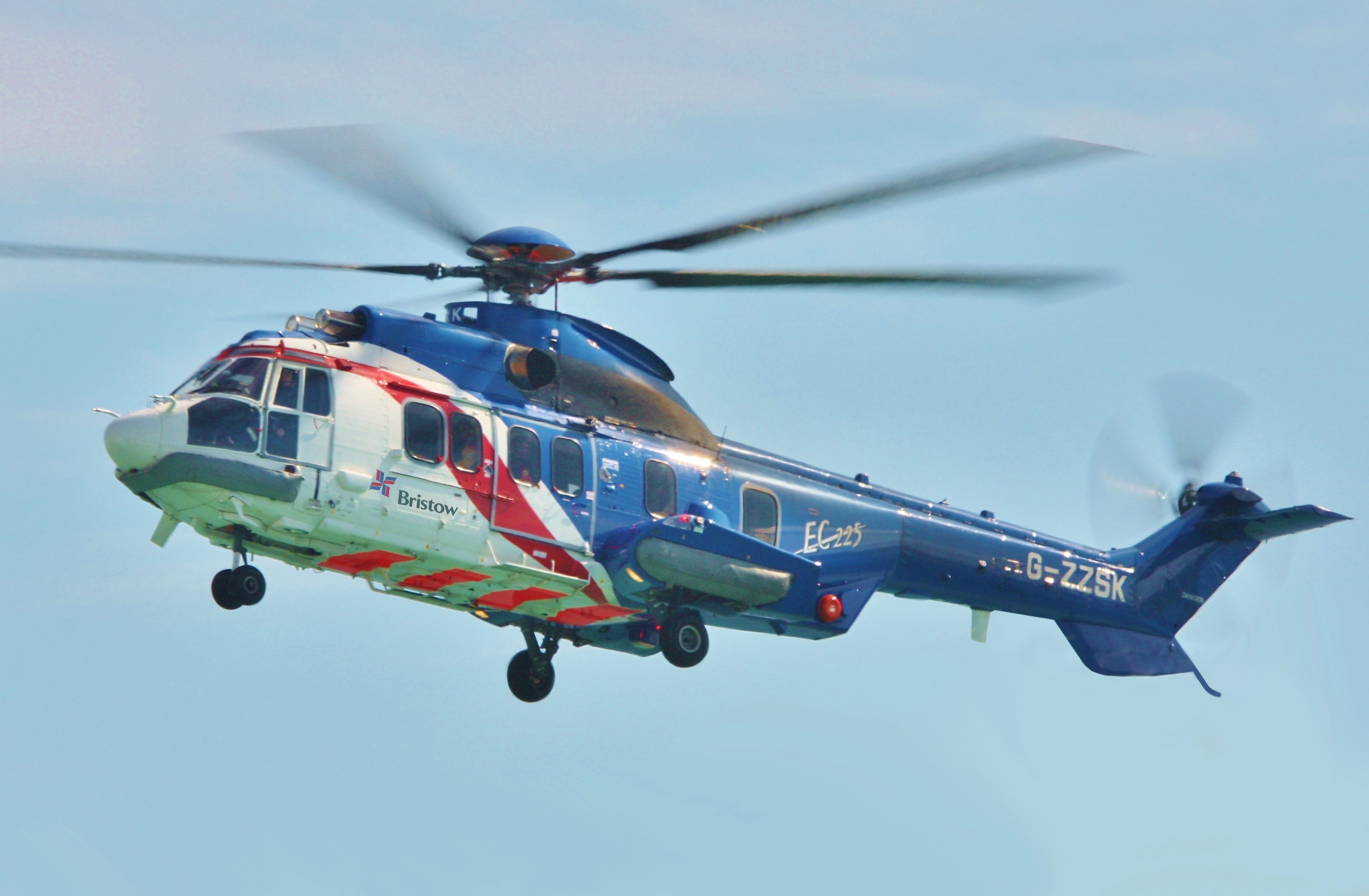
A Bristow Helicopters H225LP at Sumburgh Airport

Argentina

- Argentine Naval Prefecture

Botswana

- Botswana Defence Force

France

- French Naval Aviation

Hungary

- Hungarian Air Force (16 on order)

Iceland

- Icelandic Coast Guard — received 2 H225s in 2019 and 1 in 2021.

Japan

- Ministry of Defense
- Japan Coast Guard

Kurdistan Region

- CTG Kurdistan

Mexico

- Mexican Air Force
- Mexican Naval Aviation

Morocco

- Royal Moroccan Air Force

Oman

- Oman Royal Flight

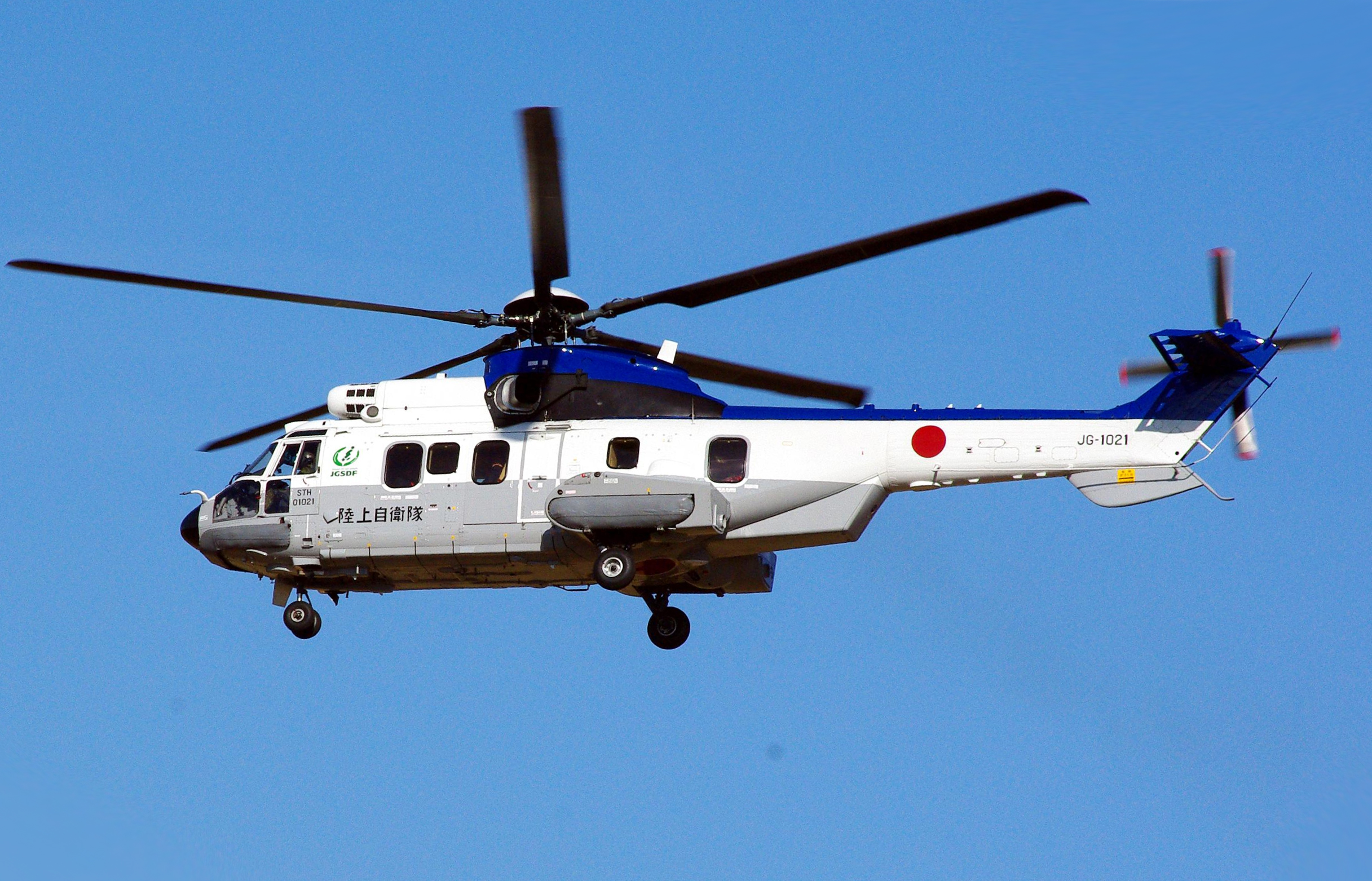
An H225 of the Japanese government

Singapore

- Republic of Singapore Air Force

Taiwan

- Republic of China Air Force

Tanzania

- Tanzania Air Force Command

Ukraine

- Ukrainian Air Guard

Vietnam

- Vietnam People's Navy

=== Civilian operators ===
Belgium

- Noordzee Helikopters Vlaanderen

China

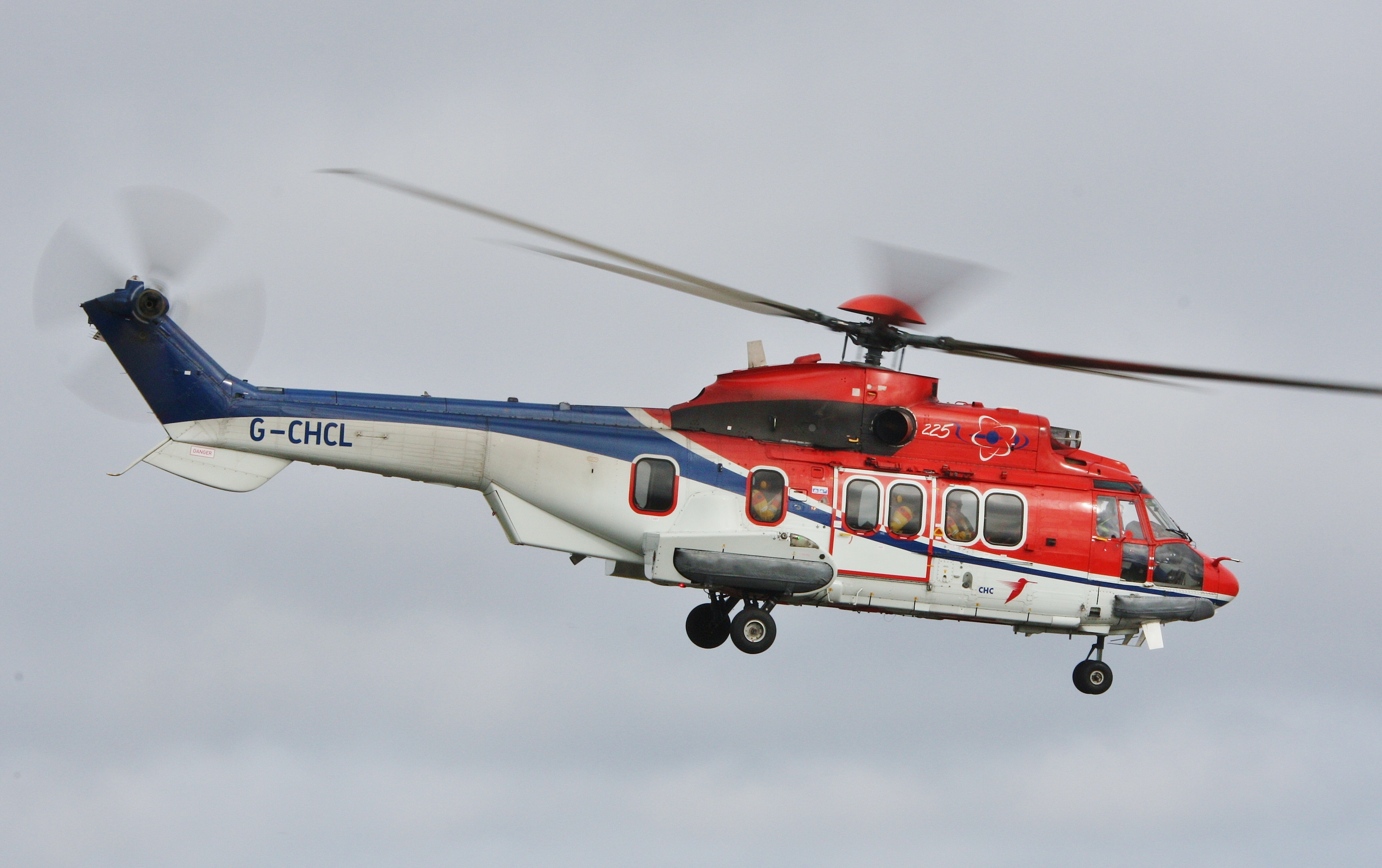
A CHC Helicopter H225 on approach

- Ministry of Transport
- Citic Offshore Helicopter Co.
- Guangdong Public Security Bureau

Greenland

- Air Greenland

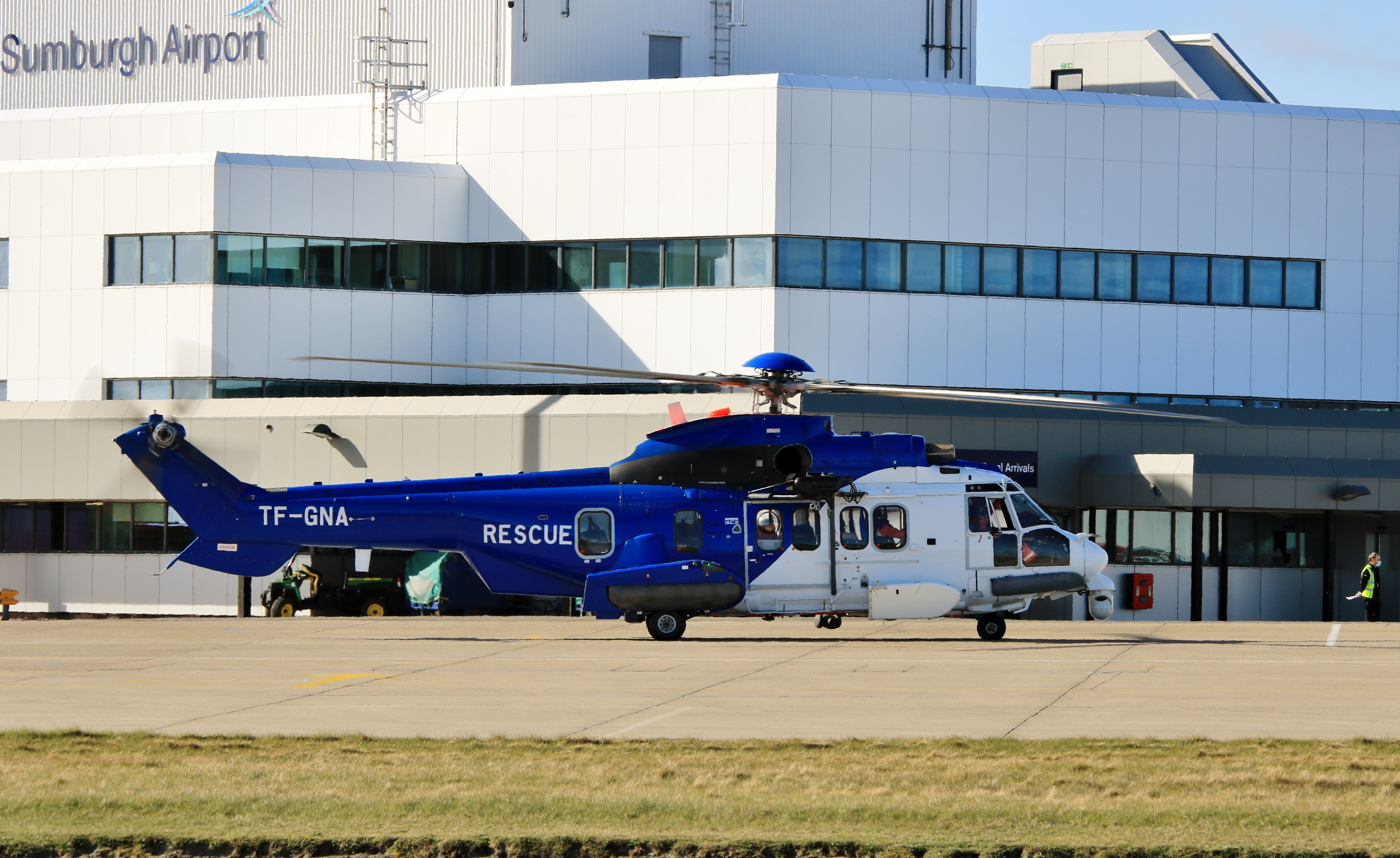
An EC225 LP of the Icelandic Coast Guard

Italy

- Westair Helicopters — received 1 H225 in 2025 and 2 expected additional units.

Japan

- Tokyo Fire Department (2 on order)

Malaysia

- MHS Aviation

Norway

- CHC Helikopter Service
- Bristow Norway

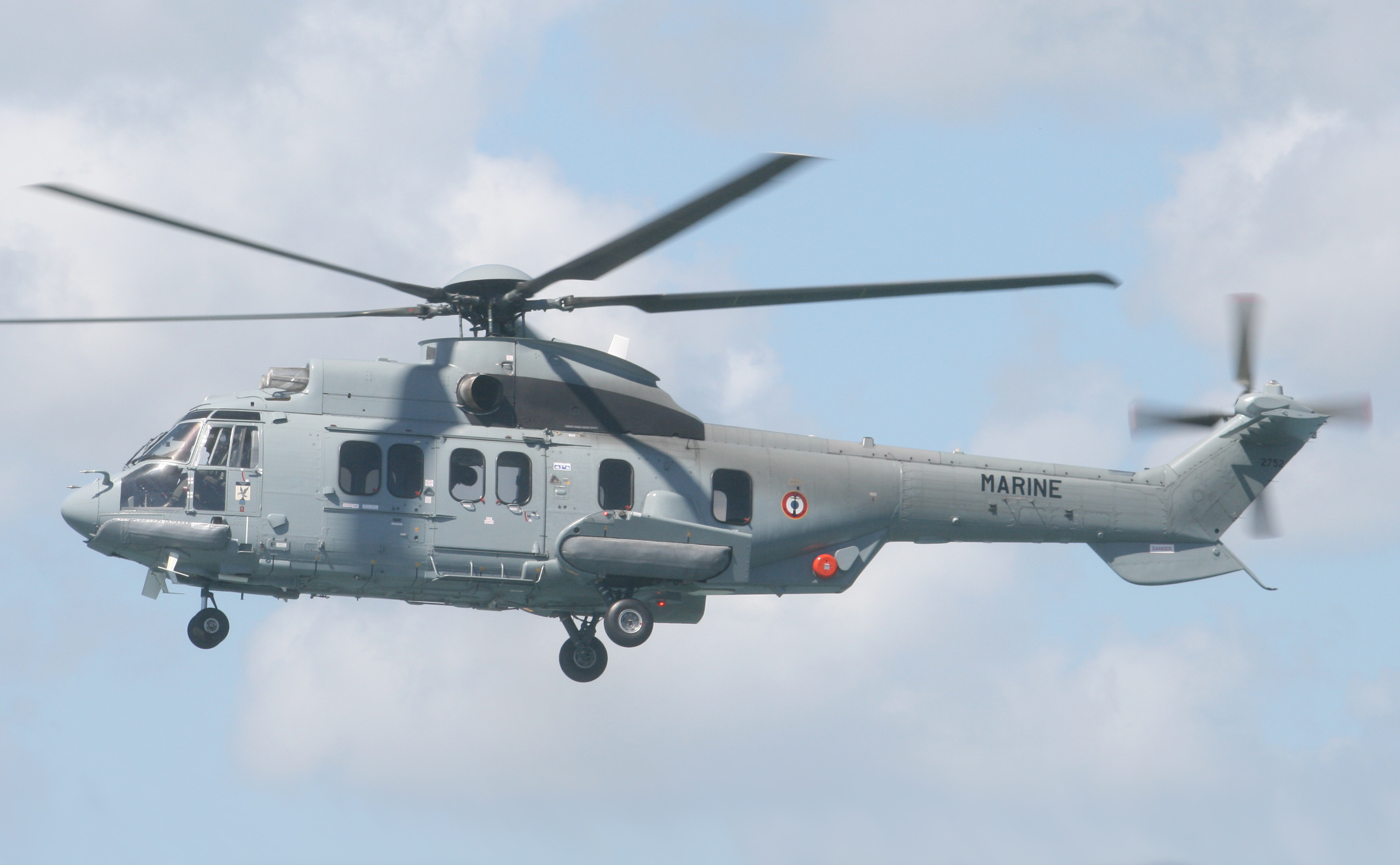
An EC225 of the French Navy

Spain

- Spanish Maritime Safety Agency

Ukraine

- Ministry of Internal Affairs (21 on order), deliveries started in December 2018.

United Kingdom

- Babcock Mission Critical Services Offshore Ltd.
- Bristow Helicopters

Vietnam

- Southern Vietnam Helicopter Company

== Accidents and incidents ==
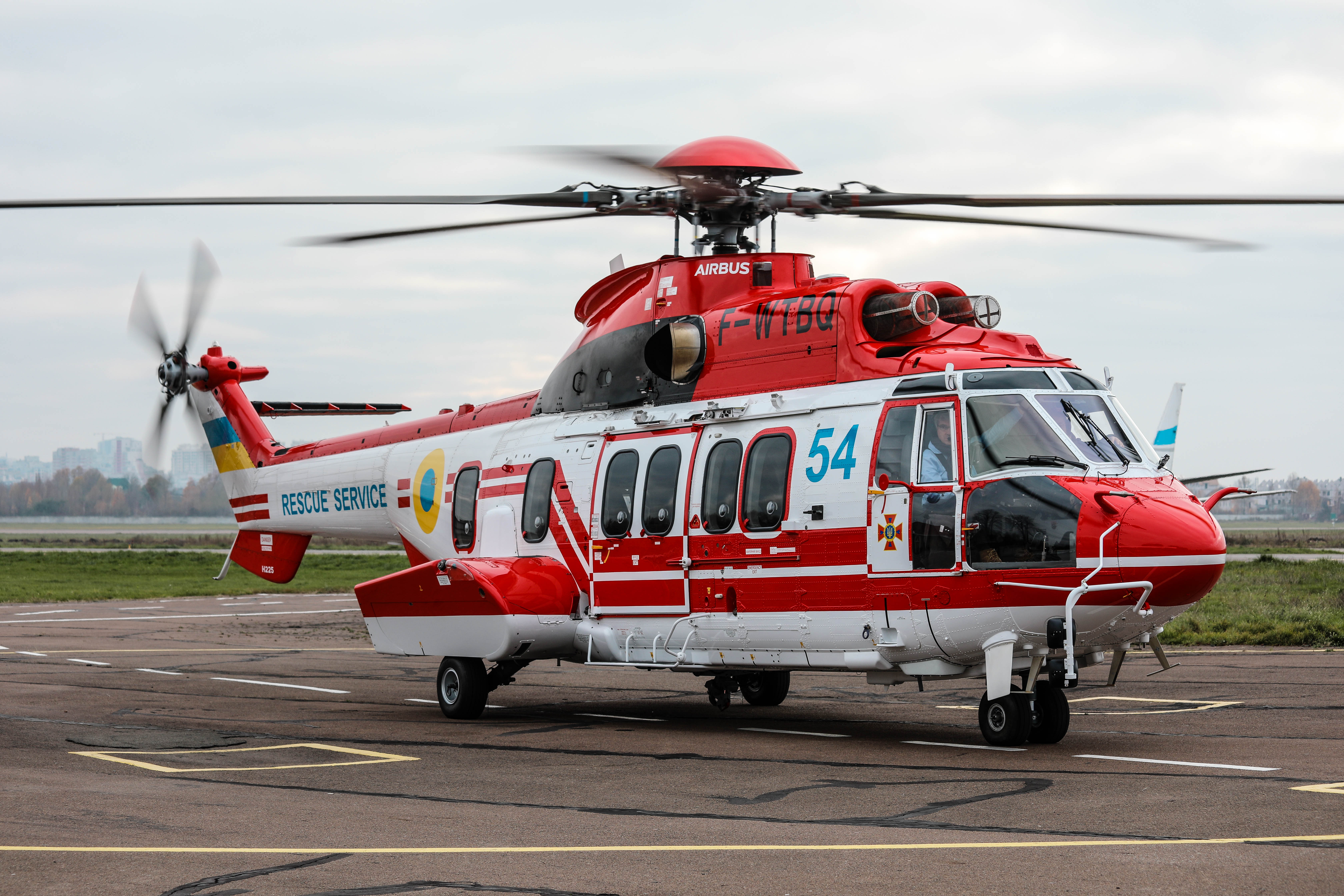
The helicopter that crashed on 18 January 2023 in November 2020

- 18 February 2009: G-REDU, an EC225 LP operated by Bond Offshore Helicopters. During a night visual approach to the ETAP platform, the helicopter descended and impacted the surface of the sea. The crew's perception of the helicopter's position and orientation relative to the platform during the final approach was erroneous. All 18 people on board survived the controlled flight into terrain (water).
- 10 May 2012: G-REDW, an EC225 LP, carried out a controlled ditching following indications of a failure of the main gearbox (MGB) lubrication system and a subsequent failure indication warning on the emergency lubrication system. An investigation by the Air Accidents Investigation Branch (AAIB) identified a 360° circumferential crack in the bevel gear vertical shaft in the main gearbox, in the vicinity of a manufacturing weld, causing disengagement of the drive to both mechanical oil pumps.
- 22 October 2012: G-CHCN, an EC225 LP of CHC Scotia, ditched in the North Sea 32 miles south west of Shetland whilst en route from Aberdeen to the West Phoenix drilling rig. All 19 on board were rescued. A special bulletin issued by the Air Accidents Investigation Branch (AAIB) said the main and standby oil pumps were not working; a 360-degree crack found on the bevel gear vertical shaft of the gearbox had prevented the oil pump gears from being driven. A worldwide grounding of the type was initiated in response. In both of the 2012 incidents, although the main gearbox lubrication system had failed, the backup system was working correctly but displaying an erroneous warning light, due to an incorrect specification of a pressure switch, which led to the helicopters being ditched.
- 29 April 2016: LN-OJF, an EC225 LP of CHC Helikopter Service, crashed at an islet near Turøy in the Bergen archipelago, en route to Bergen Airport, Flesland, from the Gullfaks B platform in the North Sea. The helicopter was carrying 11 passengers and 2 crew members; everyone on board died. Eyewitnesses reported that the main rotor separated from the hull immediately before the crash. Due to the crash, all commercial flights by EC225 helicopters, excluding search and rescue flights, were grounded by both Norwegian and British civil aviation authorities. The subsequent investigation concluded that a gear in the main rotor gearbox had failed due to a fatigue crack that had propagated under-surface, escaping detection. As a result of the incident the German Defence Ministry had also decided to ground 3 AS532 Helicopter in government use which were manufactured by the same company.
- 18 January 2023: an EC225 carrying the Minister of Internal Affairs of Ukraine, Denys Monastyrsky, his deputy Yevhen Yenin and state secretary Yurii Lubkovych, crashed at a kindergarten in Brovary, a suburb of Kyiv, Ukraine. The crash killed 14 people, including Monastyrsky, Yenin and Lubkovych; a child was also among the fatalities, while 25 others were injured.
- 8 November 2026: an EC225 was engaged in aerial fibre fighting operations in South Kalimantan, Indonesia and while lifting water from a river, the helicopter's engines lost power and crashed, killing one of the three crew members.

== Specifications (H225) ==

External videos
- EC225 – Bevel Gear Vertical Shaft Process
- Cockpit view of an EC225 taxiing and taking off
- EC225 in firefighting operations

Data from Airbus Helicopters

General characteristics

- Crew: 2 (commander + co-pilot)
- Capacity: 24 passengers + 1 cabin attendant
- Length: 19.5 m (64 ft 0 in)
- Height: 4.97 m (16 ft 4 in)
- Empty weight: 5,256 kg (11,587 lb)
- Gross weight: 11,000 kg (24,251 lb)
- Max takeoff weight: 11,200 kg (24,692 lb)
- Powerplant: 2 × Turbomeca Makila 2A1 turboshaft engines, 1,776 kW (2,382 hp) each
- Main rotor diameter: 16.2 m (53 ft 2 in)
- Main rotor area: 206.15 m^{2} (2,219.0 sq ft)

Performance

- Maximum speed: 275.5 km/h (171.2 mph, 148.8 kn)
- Cruise speed: 260.5 km/h (161.9 mph, 140.7 kn)
- Never exceed speed: 324 km/h (201 mph, 175 kn)
- Range: 857 km (533 mi, 463 nmi)
- Ferry range: 985 km (612 mi, 532 nmi)
- Service ceiling: 5,900 m (19,400 ft)
- Rate of climb: 8.7 m/s (1,710 ft/min)

== See also ==
Related development

- Aérospatiale SA 330 Puma
- Eurocopter AS332 Super Puma
- Eurocopter AS532 Cougar
- Eurocopter EC725

Aircraft of comparable role, configuration, and era

- AgustaWestland AW101
- Sikorsky S-92
- Mil Mi-38

Related lists

- List of rotorcraft
