= Turbomeca Makila =

Family of French

Makila
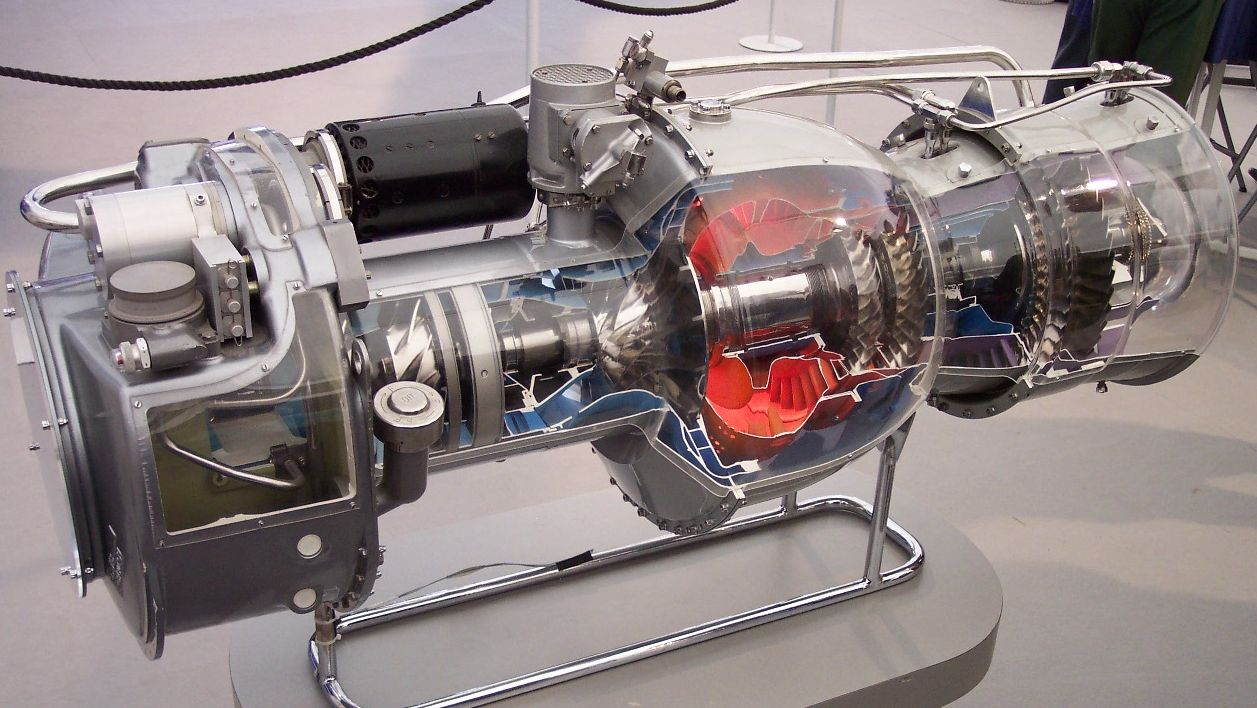
- Cutaway view of a Turbomeca Makila
- Type: Free-turbine turboshaft
- National origin: France
- Manufacturer: Turbomeca/SAFRAN
- First run: 1976
- Major applications: Aérospatiale Super Puma; Denel Rooivalk
- Number built: 2,200

The Turbomeca Makila is a family of French turboshaft engines for helicopter use, first run in 1976 and flown in 1977.

Typical power output is around 1,300 kW (1,700 hp). As of 2012, some 2,200 had been built.

== Applications ==
- Puma HC Mk 2
- Aérospatiale Super Puma
- Denel Oryx
- Denel Rooivalk
- Eurocopter AS532 Cougar
- Eurocopter EC225 Super Puma
- Eurocopter EC725
- IAR 330 SM
- RTL II & RTL III Turboliner

== Variants ==
Makila 1A
1,240 kW (1,660 shp)
Makila 1A1
1,357 kW (1,820 shp)
Makila 1A2
1,376 kW (1,845 shp)
Makila 1A4

Makila 2A
1,801 kW (2,415 shp)
Makila 2A1

Makila 2B

Makila T1
Also known as the Turbomeca TM-1600, capable of producing 1,050 kW as an electrical generator and 1,600 horsepower (1,200 kW) as a marine engine.

== Specifications (Makila 2A) ==
Data from Turbomeca.

==== General characteristics ====
- Type: Free-turbine turboshaft
- Length: 1,836 mm (72 in)
- Diameter: 498 mm (20 in)
- Dry weight: 278.9 kg (including FADEC)

==== Components ====
- Compressor: 3-stage axial flow LP, single-stage centrifugal flow HP (both mounted on HP shaft)
- Combustors: Annular
- Turbine: 2-stage axial flow HP turbine, 2-stage axial flow free power turbine with rearwards output shaft

==== Performance ====
- Maximum power output: 1,801kW (2,415 shp)

== See also ==
Related lists

- List of aircraft engines
