= Eurocopter EC725 =

Military medium-lift helicopter

EC725 Caracal / Super Cougar H225M
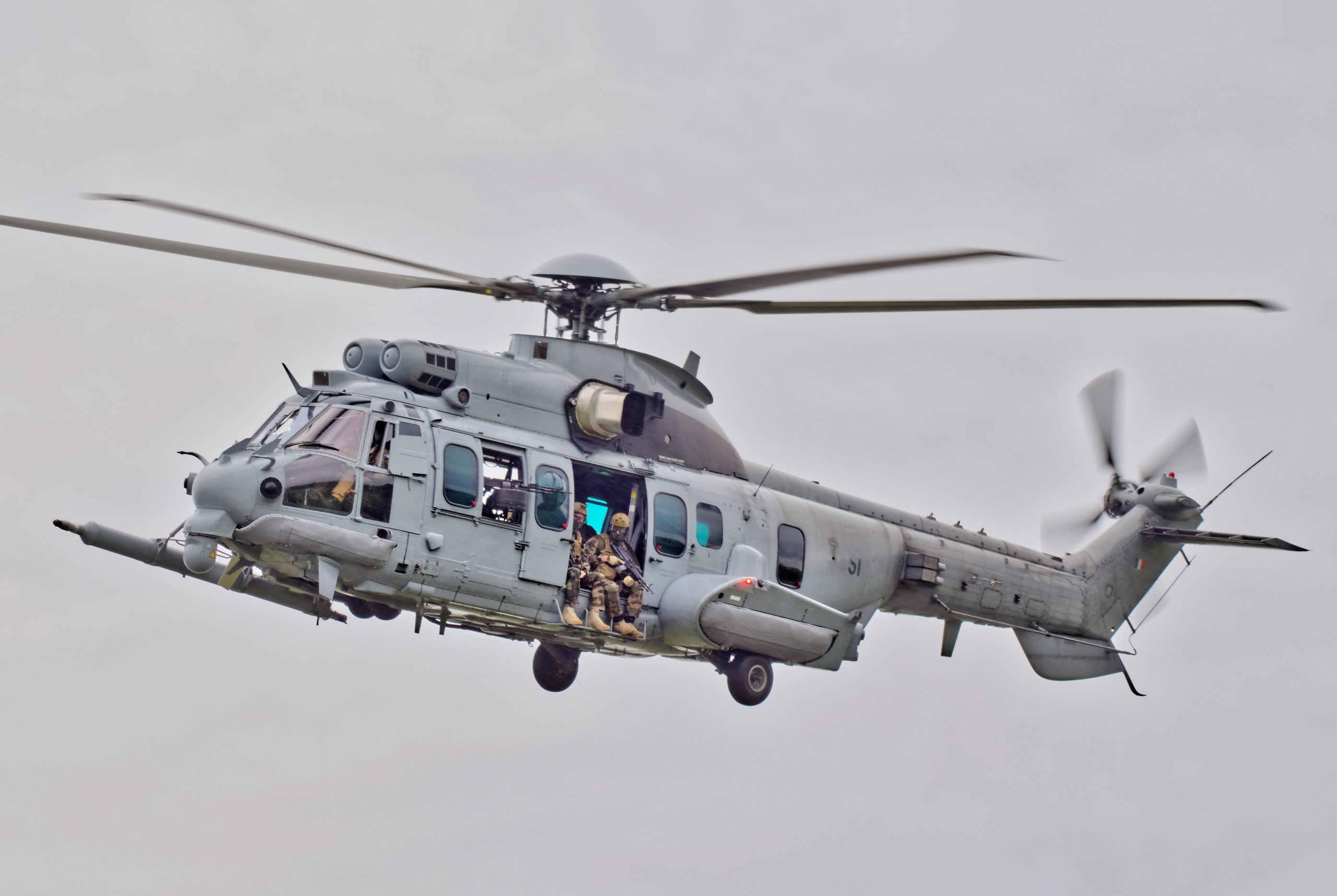
- A French Air and Space Force EC725 Caracal

General information
- Type: Tactical transport helicopter/armed helicopter
- National origin: Multinational
- Manufacturer: Eurocopter; Airbus Helicopters
- Status: In service
- Primary user: French Armed Forces
- Number built: 350

History
- Manufactured: 2000–present
- Introduction date: February 2005
- First flight: 27 November 2000
- Developed from: Eurocopter AS532 Cougar
- Variant: Eurocopter EC225 Super Puma

The Airbus Helicopters H225M (formerly Eurocopter EC725 Caracal), is a long-range tactical transport military helicopter developed from the Airbus Helicopters AS532 Cougar. It is a twin-engined aircraft and can carry up to 28 seated troops along with two crew, depending on configuration. The helicopter is marketed for troop transport, casualty evacuation, and combat search and rescue duties. Its civilian variant is the H225 Super Puma.

== Development ==
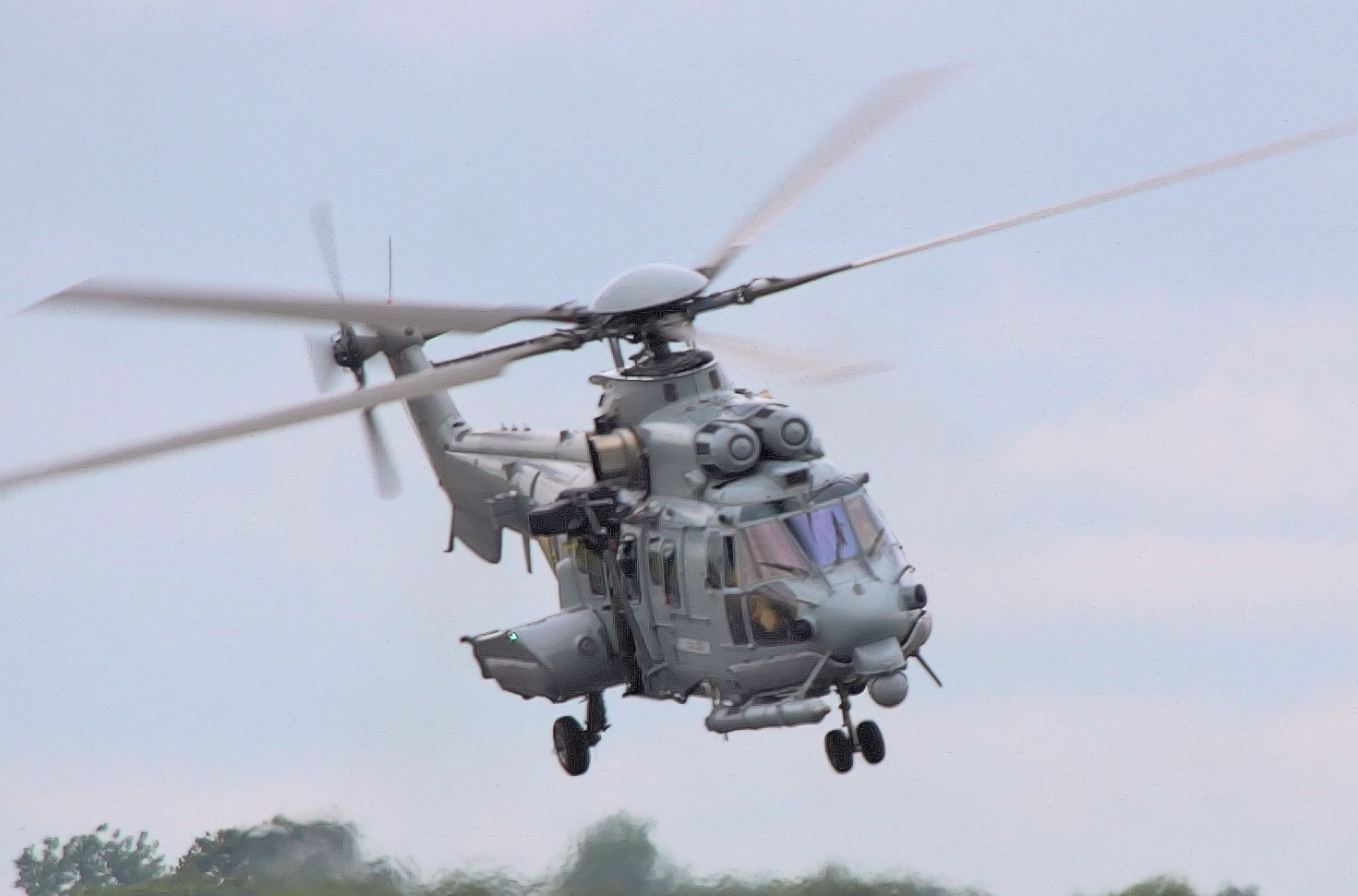
The EC725 Caracal at RIAT 2009

The EC725 was developed to meet a French Air Force requirement for a specialist helicopter for Combat Search and Rescue operations. The AS 532 A2 Cougar model was examined and rejected for this purpose following extensive trials between 1996 and 1999. The primary improvements desired by the French Air Force were more powerful engines, greater flight endurance and improved combat durability. Eurocopter opted to pursue development of a more ambitious derivative of the AS 532 to meet this need, which was later designated as the EC725. The EC725 was initially named Cougar Mk II+ for treaty reasons. The new aircraft also featured new mission equipment and autonomous avionics, along with other changes to meet the French specification.

On 27 November 2000, the first EC725 prototype performed its maiden flight at Marignane, and on 15 January 2001, the first public presentation of the new helicopter took place. In concurrent development of the military-orientated EC725, Eurocopter also developed a civil-orientated counterpart, which was designated as the EC225. The French Air Force subsequently ordered an initial six EC725s to perform the Combat Search & Rescue mission, the first of these was delivered in February 2005. A follow-on order for eight more EC725s was placed for the French Armed Forces in November 2002; a total fleet of 20 EC725s in French service was envisioned in 2004.

By 2015, the EC725, re-designated as the H225M, was being manufactured on two separate production lines in France and Brazil. In July 2015, Airbus Helicopters announced that it was considering setting up a third assembly line in India if the firm was successful at winning an Indian tender for naval helicopters.

== Design ==
The EC725 is based on the Eurocopter AS 532 Cougar, improving upon the design with a five-blade composite main rotor incorporating a new airfoil shape to reduce vibration levels. The helicopter can be fitted with removable armour plating to protect the troops and is powered by two Turbomeca Makila 1A4 turboshaft engines mounted over the cabin, which feature a dual-channel full authority digital engine control (FADEC) system. They can be fitted with an anti-icing system to enable the aircraft to operate in very cold climates. Other improvements include a reinforced main rotor gearbox and an all glass cockpit. The cockpit is equipped with an integrated display system featuring a digital map and active-matrix liquid-crystal display.

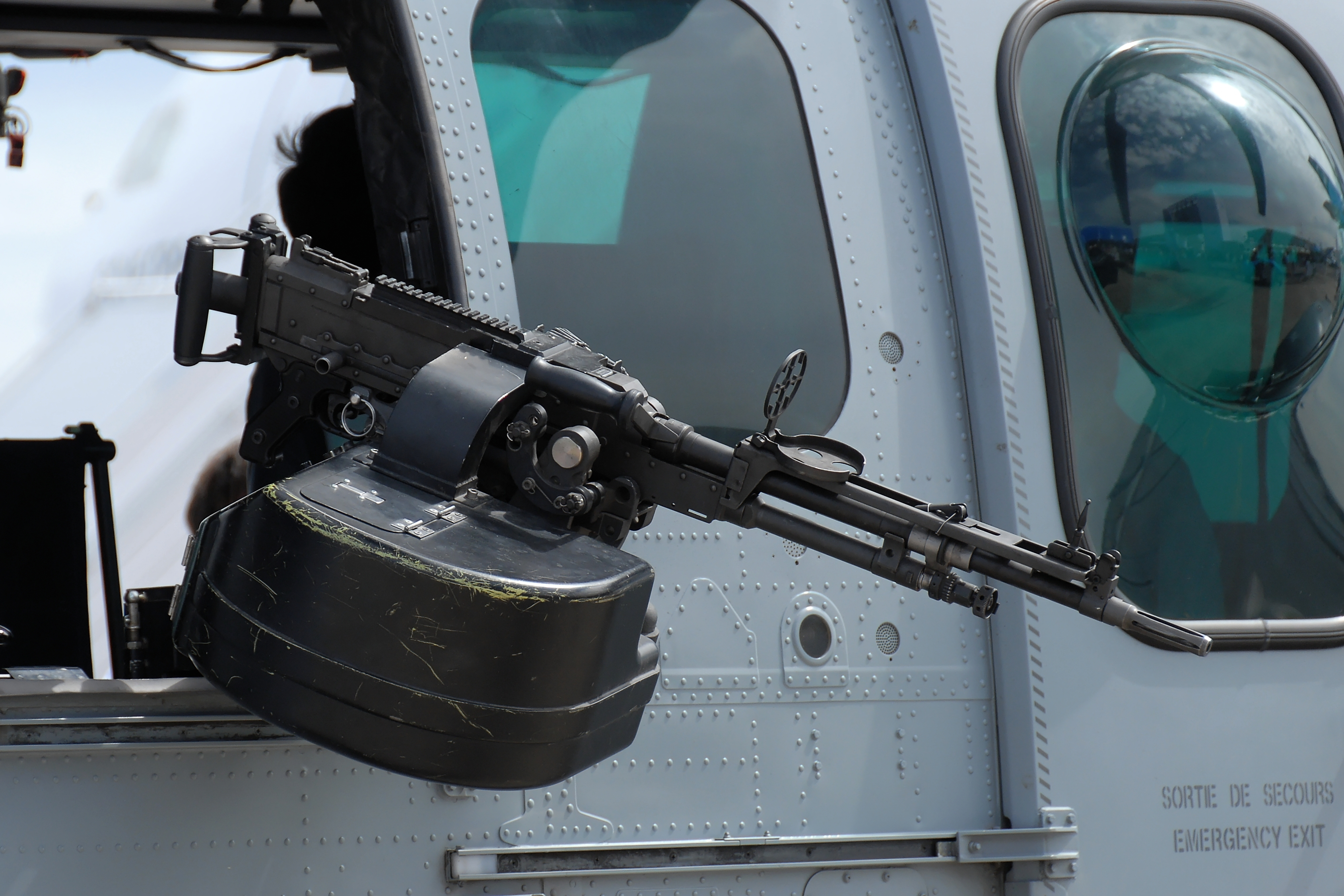
An FN MAG mounted on an EC725

The EC725 can be equipped with various military equipment and armaments, such as a pair of 7.62 mm FN MAG machine guns mounted within forward left and right windows, or a pair of 68 mm (2.75") Thales Brandt or Forges de Zeebrugge side-mounted rocket launchers, each with 19 rockets, or the MU90 Impact aerial-launched torpedo. Furthermore, a combination of gun pods, rocket pods and Hellfire air-to-surface missiles can be mounted externally via the HForce Generic Weapon System (GWS) and targeted with Thales Scorpion helmet-mounted sight display (HMSD) and Wescam electro-optical sensor. The Exocet anti-ship missile has also been integrated upon Brazilian Navy EC725s. Brazilian EC725s are equipped with a Helibras-built countermeasures suite, which includes chaff and flares to confuse radar and heat-guided missiles respectively; Thales has also produced self-protection systems to equip French EC725s.

Eurocopter developed four primary cabin configurations for the type. The Troop Transport version contains a seating arrangement for a maximum of 29 troops, in addition to the crew. A dedicated VIP transport version is designed to contain between 8 and 12 passengers. The Casualty Evacuation version can carry up to 12 stretchers along with a total of four seated medical staff. The Combat SAR configuration is fully equipped to perform search and rescue duties in a combat environment. According to Airbus Helicopters, the H225M is capable of undertaking various mission roles including combat search and rescue, long-range tactical transport, aeromedical transport, logistic support and shipboard maritime operations. The helicopter has day and night time search and rescue capabilities by way of a search radar and forward-looking infrared (FLIR); these allow the EC725 to be flown under visual meteorological and instrument flight rules conditions.

== Operational history ==
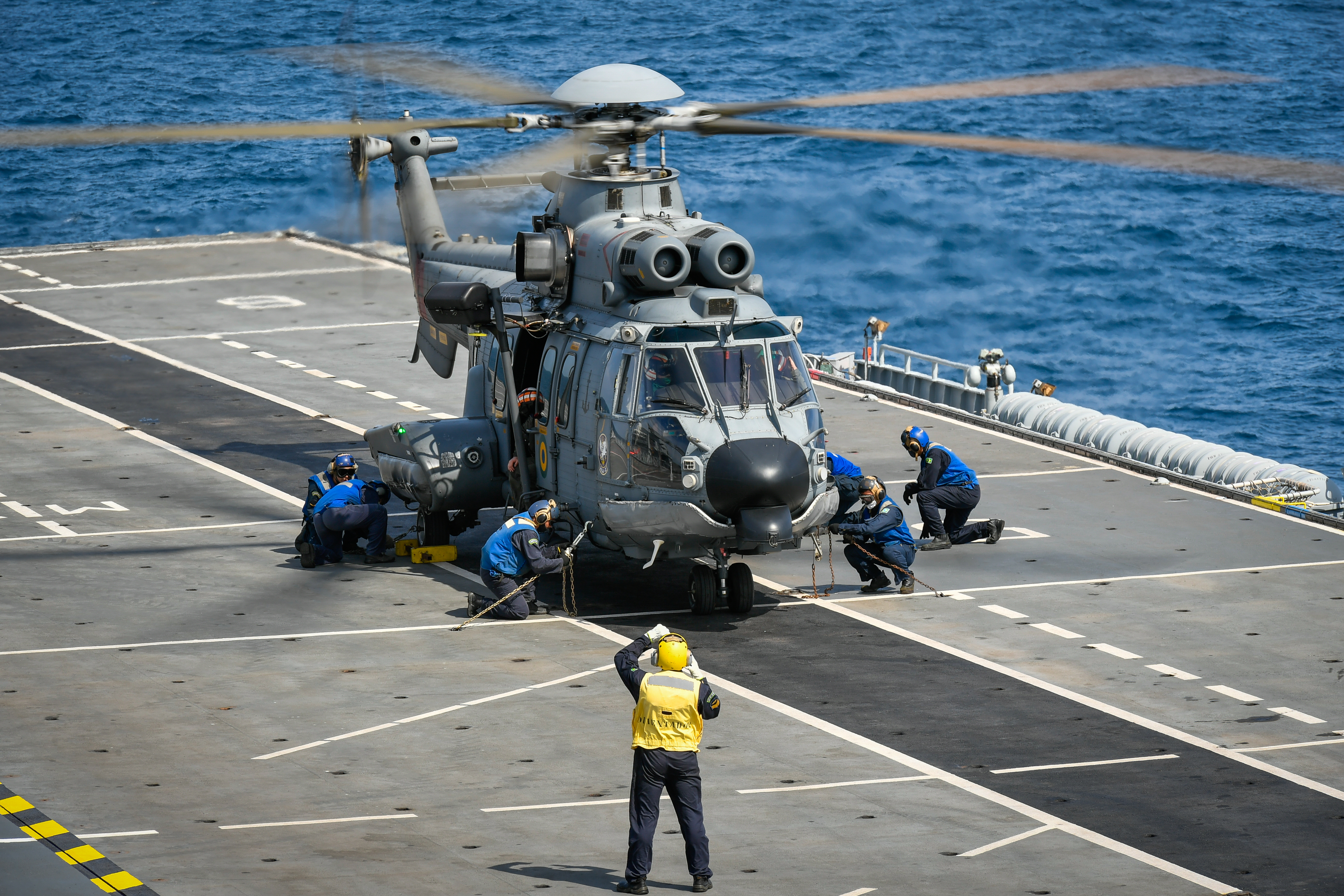
EC725 of the Brazilian Navy aboard helicopter carrier Atlântico, 2021

Less than six weeks after formally entering service, three French Air Force EC725s were dispatched to Cyprus to evacuate civilians from Lebanon during Opération Baliste in the summer of 2006. In December 2006, the French Air Force began deploying EC725s to the war in Afghanistan to support the coalition forces operating in region. EC725s in the Afghan theatre were based at Kabul International Airport. In 2013, French EC725s received several upgrades including a new SAGEM Forward looking infrared sensor, new door-mounted Nexter-built machine guns, FADEC changes for low temperature operations, and reduced maintenance requirements.

In 2008, the Brazilian Government announced that the Helibras factory in Itajubá, Minas Gerais, would produce an initial 50 EC725s as part of a $1 billion order for its Naval Aviation, the Air Force (FAB) and Army Aviation.

By December 2010, three helicopters were undergoing flight tests prior to entering military service. In 2012, Helibras begin assembly of the rest of the order. In April 2014, Helibras and MBDA were in the process of integrating the anti-ship Exocet missile, which are 50%-built in Brazil. On 19 June 2014, the Brazilian Navy formally accepted delivery of the first EC725. By July 2015, the Brazilian armed forces had taken delivery of 16 H225Ms; deliveries were reported at the time to continue until 2019. By 1 October 2015, Brazil's H225M fleet had attained 10,000 flight hours. In December 2015, Helibras delivered the first pair of H225Ms to be delivered to a full operational capability (FOC) standard to the Brazilian military.

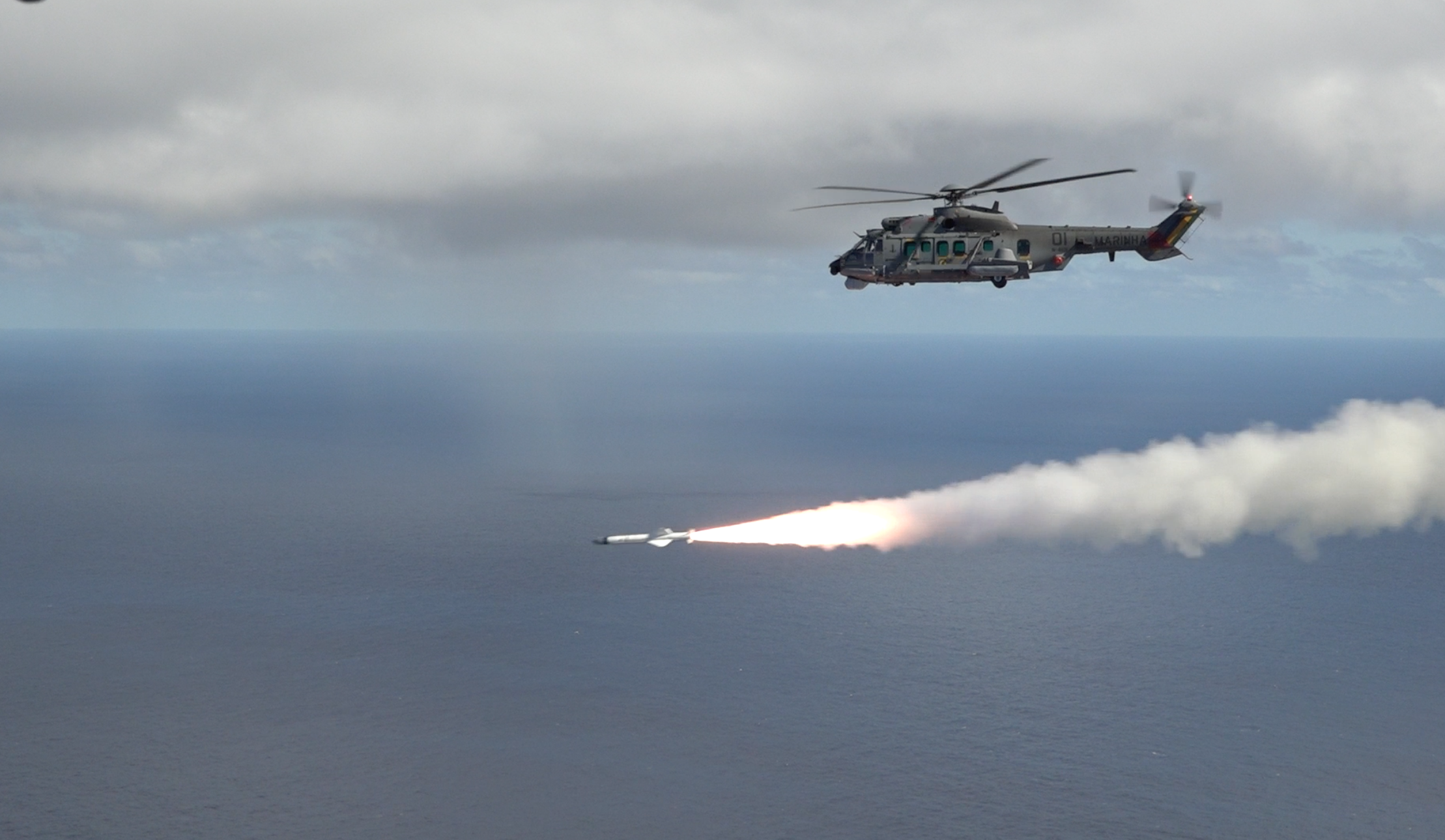
EC725 of the Brazilian Navy firing a Exocet missile, 2021

In March 2009, Mexico became the second export customer for the type when the Secretariat of National Defense placed an order for six armed EC725s for civil security and transport missions; a second batch of six was ordered in September 2010. On 30 April 2015, a Mexican Air Force EC725 made an emergency landing after the tail rotor was struck by a rocket-propelled grenade, killing six soldiers and wounding 12, while engaged in Operation Jalisco, a coordinated multi-force action to combat the Jalisco New Generation Cartel (CJNG) in both Jalisco and Colima. In May 2015, Mexico was reportedly in the process of negotiating the purchase of an additional 50 H225Ms.

In April 2009, Malaysia placed an order for 12 EC725s in a Search and Rescue configuration to replace the ageing Sikorsky SH-3 Sea King fleet. In 2014, following Malaysia Airlines Flight 370 going missing, the Royal Malaysian Air Force deployed their EC725s was deployed to search the plane along C-130s around the South China Sea and Strait of Malacca. Following the 2015 Sabah earthquake, several Royal Malaysia Air Force EC725s were despatched to Laban Rata in Mount Kinabalu to rescue stranded climbers and retrieve the deceased.

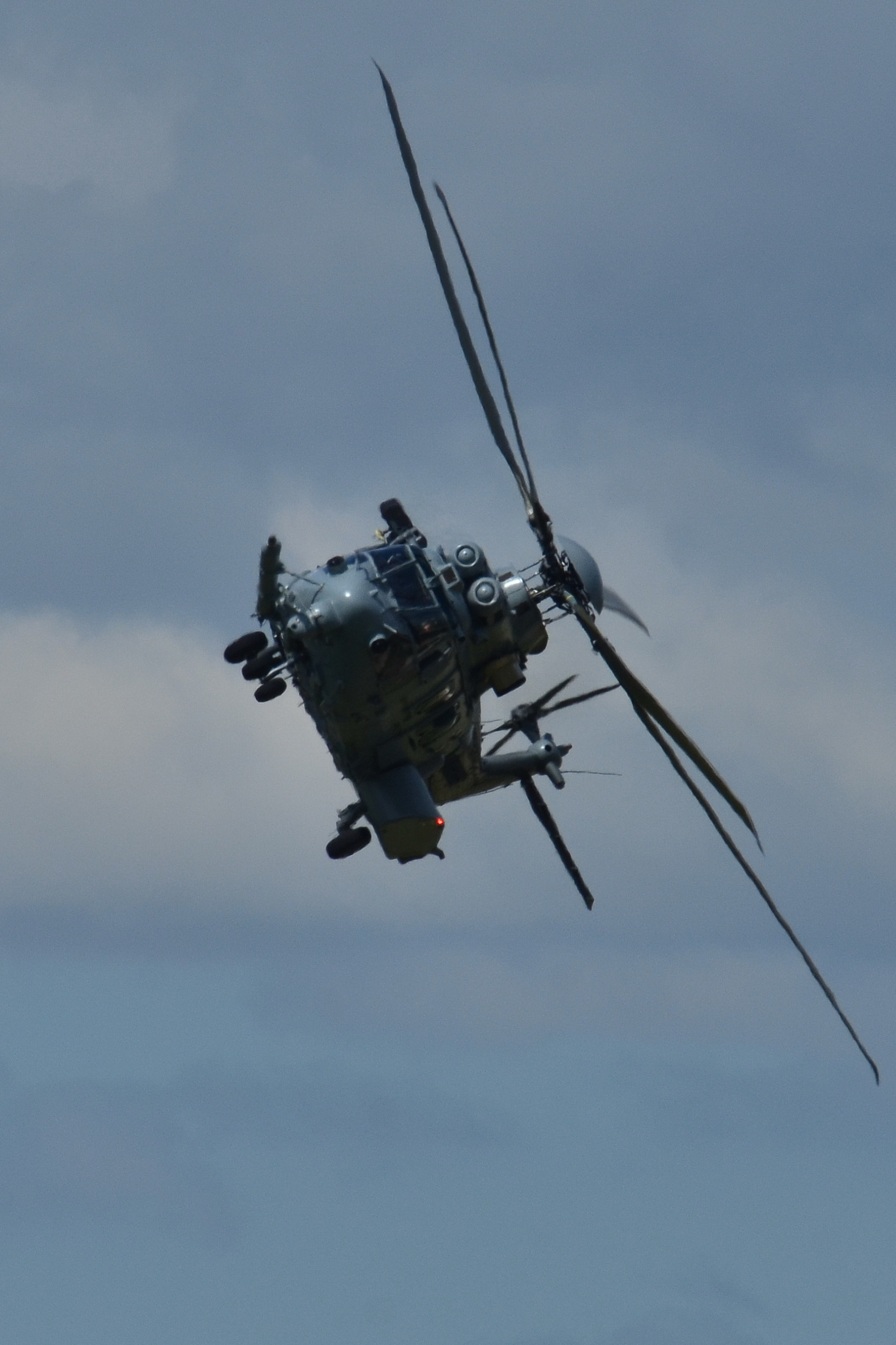
EC725 in flight at a steep angle, France, 2013

In November 2014, the Indonesian Air Force took delivery of the first of six EC725s for Combat Search and Rescue (CSAR) operations. Indonesian Aerospace (PT. Dirgantara Indonesia/PTDI) performs the maintenance, repair and overhaul activities upon Indonesia's EC725 fleet; the firm also supply the tail booms and airframe assemblies for EC225s and EC725s worldwide, the first locally assembled main fuselage assembly was delivered in November 2013.

On 21 April 2015, Poland announced an order for 50 H225M units to replace their tri-service fleet of Mil Mi-8 and Mil Mi-14. If signed, the contract would consist of 16 transport, 13 combat search and rescue, eight anti-submarine warfare, eight special forces and five medical evacuation helicopters to be assembled in Poland. In May 2015, the H225M passed state trials held in 33rd Air Base over the course of two weeks. In October 2015, Poland's armament inspectorate reported that the total procurement cost would be roughly PLN13.3 billion ($3.5 billion), 40 per cent of which being for training and logistical support. However, in October 2016, Poland dropped out of offset negotiations prior to concluding the deal. According to former President of Poland Aleksander Kwasniewski, the H225M purchase had been part of a gentlemen's agreement under which France had cancelled an arranged sale of two Mistral-class amphibious assault ships to Russia.

In August 2016, the Kuwait Ministry of Defense and Airbus Helicopters signed a $1 billion contract for 30 H225M helicopters; 24 of these are for the Kuwait Air Force and six are for the Kuwait National Guard, these are to be armed with anti-ship missiles In January 2019 however, Kuwaiti Minister of Defense Nasser Sabah Al-Ahmad Al-Sabah announced that it would set up a committee of inquiry into the procurement of the helicopters regarding possible financial violations.

On 7 November 2016, Singapore announced that the H225M would replace its existing Super Pumas, which had been in service since 1983, after a rigorous evaluation process. This would enable the Republic of Singapore Air Force to meet its requirements for a wide spectrum of operations, including Search and Rescue (SAR), Aeromedical Evacuation (AME) and Humanitarian Assistance and Disaster Relief (HADR) operations, more efficiently with fewer helicopters and less manpower.

On 3 December 2021, UAE ordered 12 Caracal helicopters.

On 5 June 2023 the Royal Netherlands Air Force announced the replacement of its current Eurocopter AS532 Cougar helicopters with 14 H225s. The helicopters will be used to support their Special Operation Forces. On 5 November 2024 the order had been formalised during Euronaval 2024. Because of budgetary issues, the order had been downsized to 12 H225Ms.

== Variants ==
HM-4
Brazilian Army designation for the EC725.
AH-15
Brazilian Navy designation for an attack variant of the EC725.
UH-15/UH-15A
Brazilian Navy designation for utility variants of the EC725.
H-36
Brazilian Air Force designation for the EC725.
VH-36
Brazilian Air Force designation for a VIP transport variant of the EC725.
H.11
(Thai: ฮ.๑๑) Royal Thai Armed Forces designation for the H225M.

== Operators ==
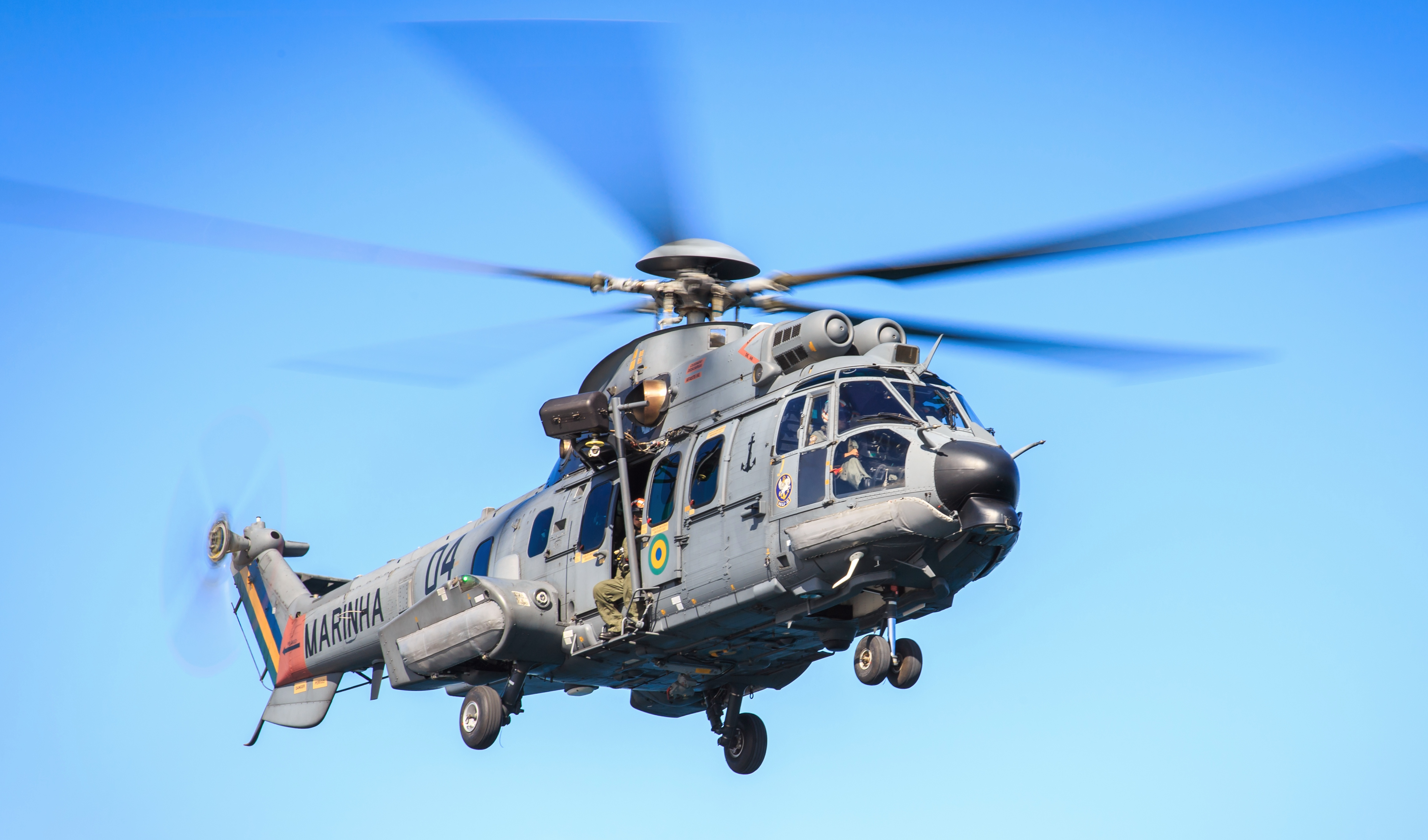
A EC725 of the Brazilian Navy

=== Military operators ===
==== Current operators ====
Brazil

- Brazilian Air Force – 14 (+2 on order)
- Brazilian Naval Aviation – 13 (+2 on order)
- Brazilian Army Aviation – 14 (+2 on order)

France

- French Air and Space Force – 19 (+4 on order)
- French Army Light Aviation – 8

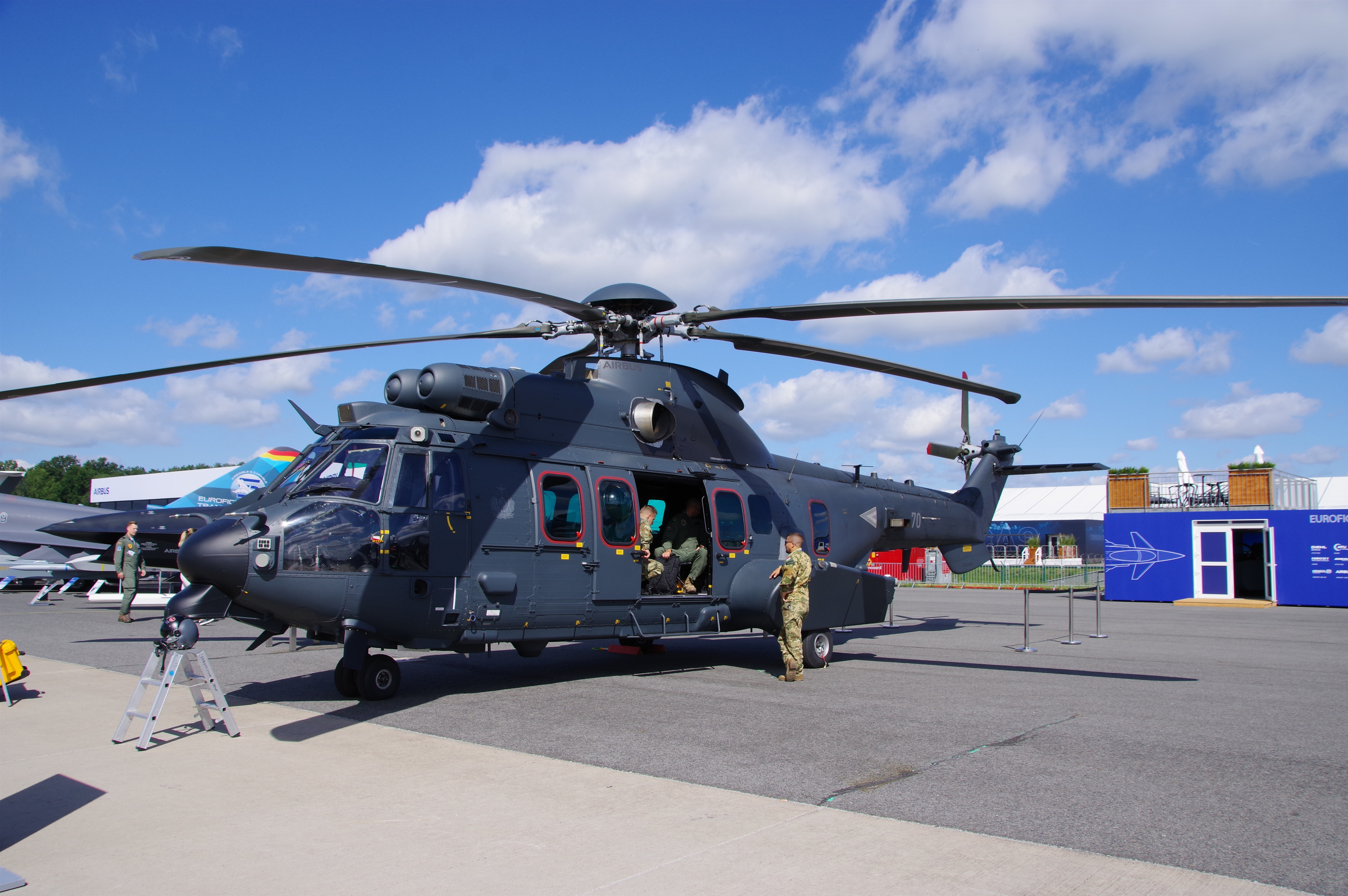
H225M of the Hungarian Air Force

Hungary

- Hungarian Air Force – 16

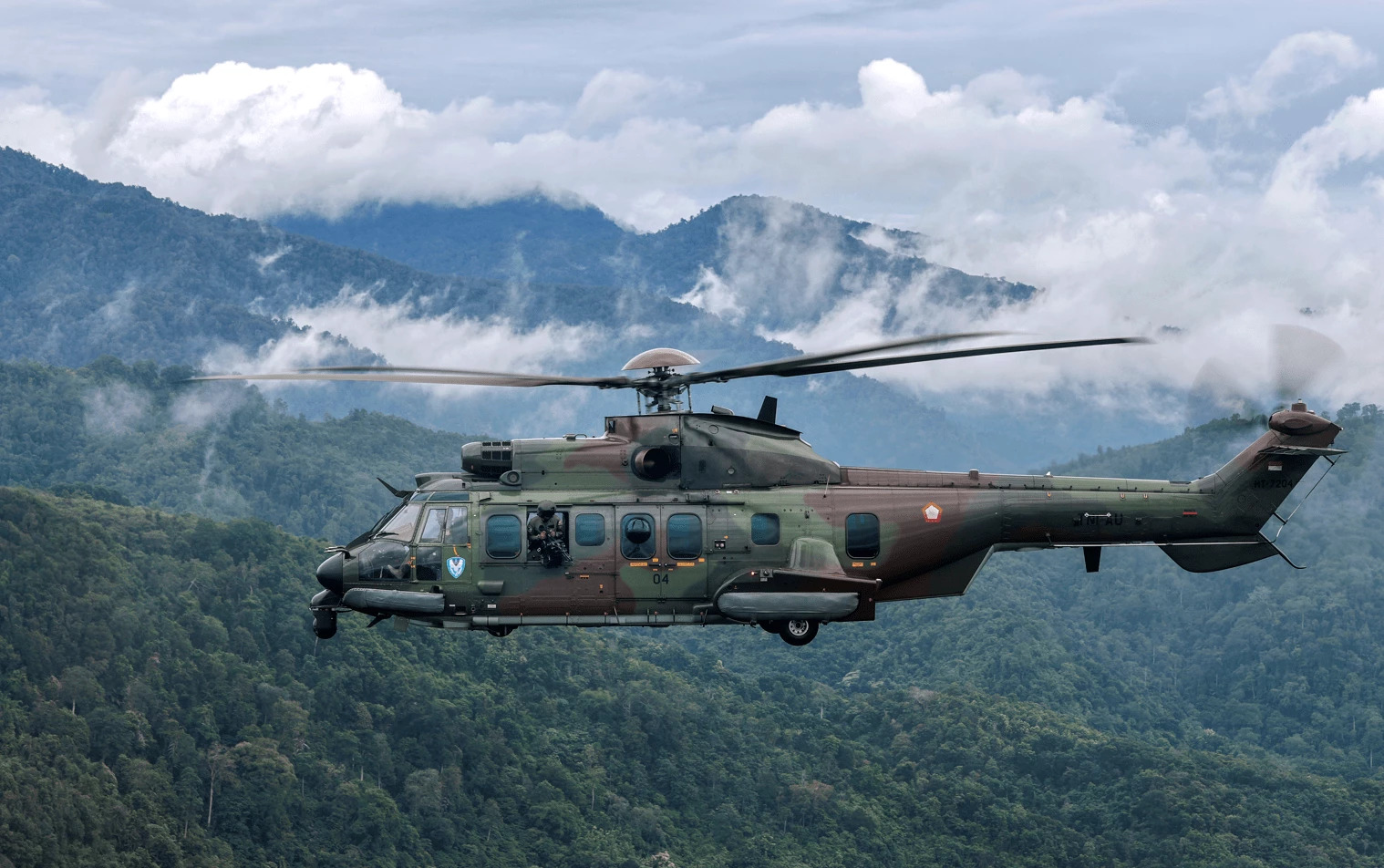
A EC725 of the Indonesian Air Force

Indonesia

- Indonesian Air Force – 14

Iraq

- Iraqi Army Aviation Command – 2 (+10 on order)

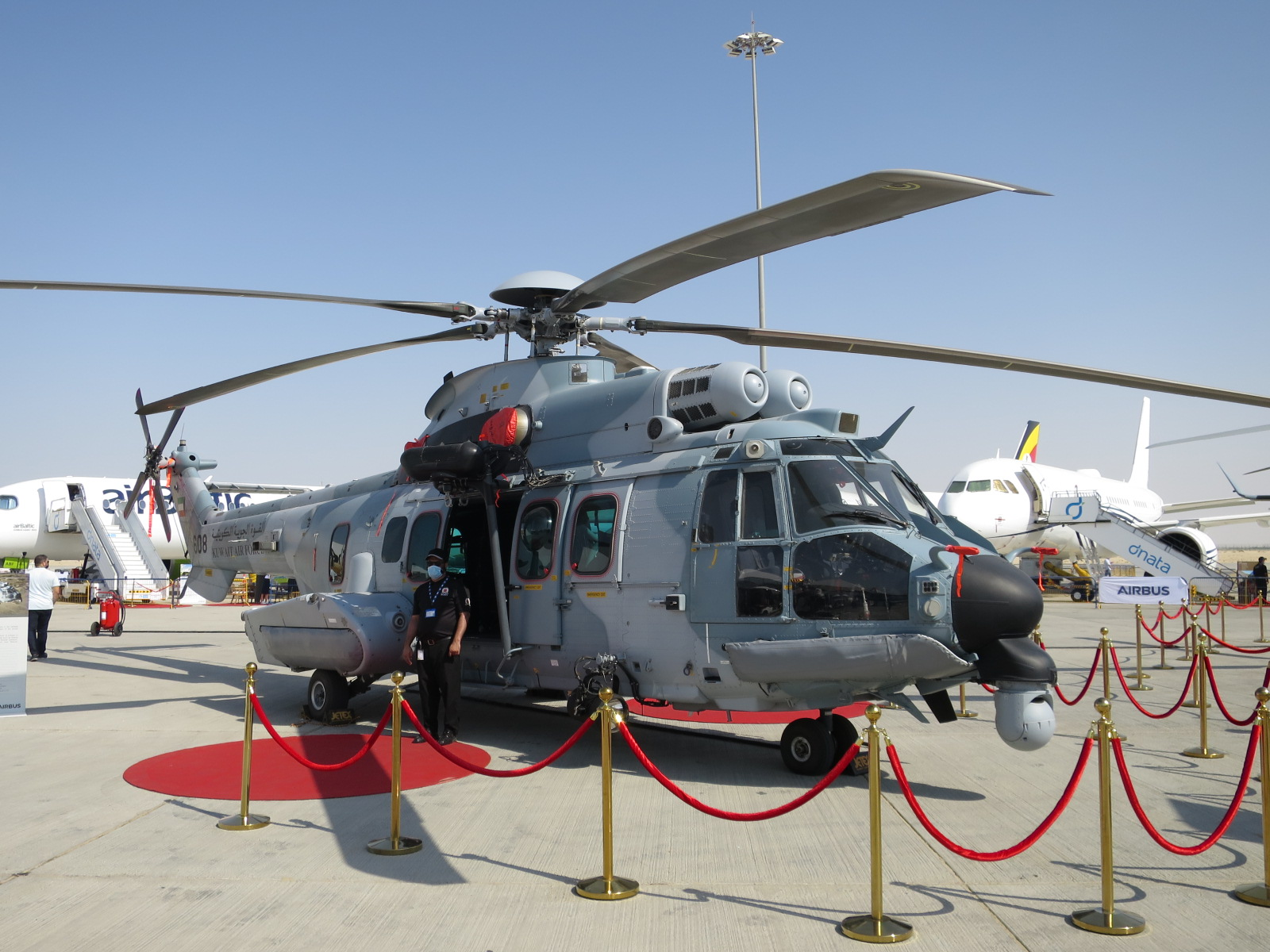
Kuwait Air Force H225M at Dubai Airshow 2021

Kuwait

- Kuwait Air Force – 24
- Kuwait Naval Force – 4
- Kuwait National Guard – 6

Malaysia

- Royal Malaysian Air Force – 12 in service. 4 more to be acquired.

Mexico

- Mexican Air Force – 12 (+4 on order)
- Mexican Naval Aviation – 3

Singapore

- Republic of Singapore Air Force – 16

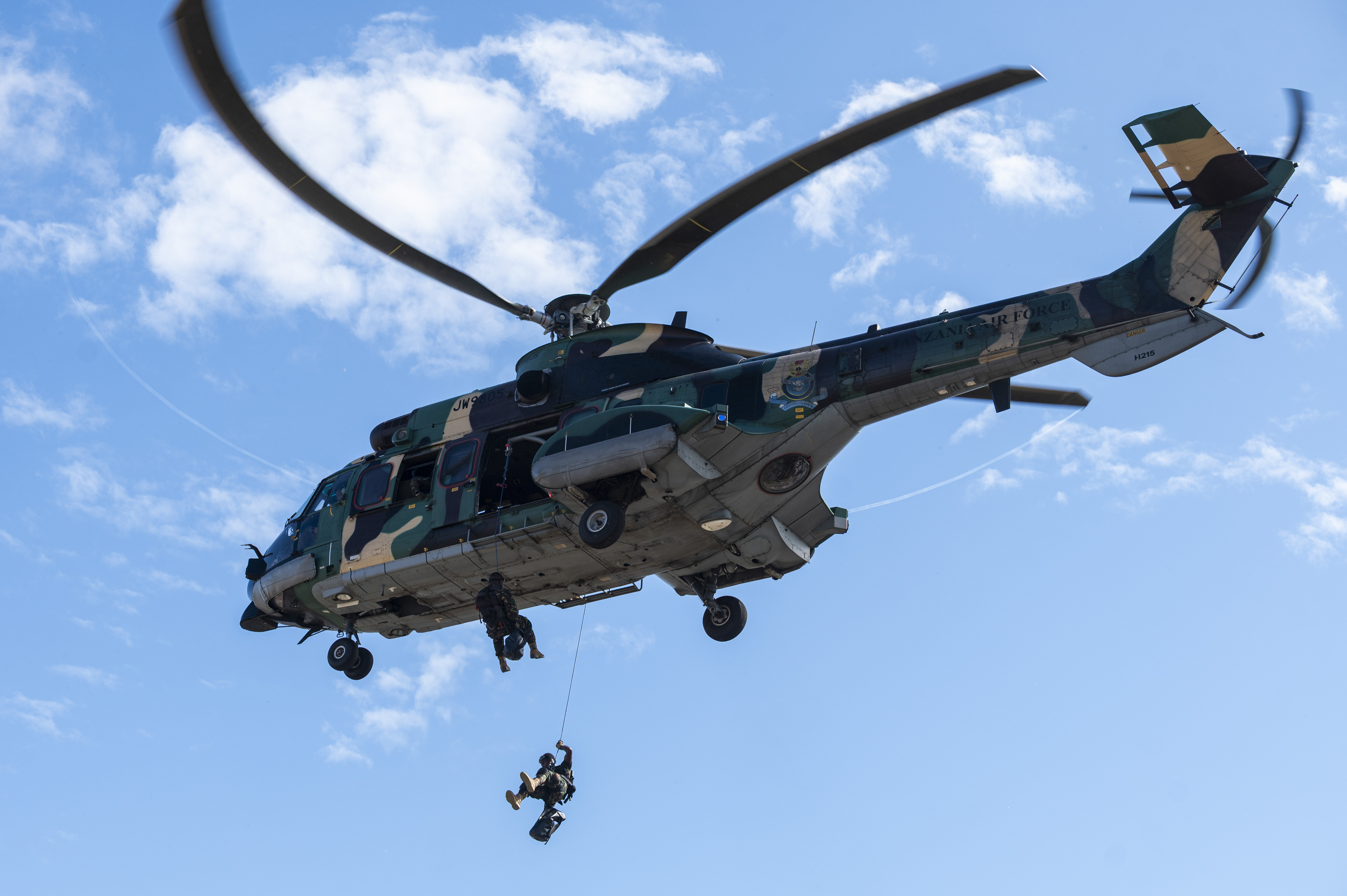
A Tanzanian H225M

Tanzania

- Tanzania Air Force Command – 2

Thailand

- Royal Thai Air Force – 12 (+2 on order)

==== Future operators ====
Morocco

- Royal Moroccan Air Force – (+10 on order)

Netherlands

- Royal Netherlands Air and Space Force – 12 on order

Romania

- Romanian Air Force – 12 on order

== Specifications (H225) ==

Data from Airbus Helicopter

General characteristics

- Crew: 1 or 2 (pilot + co-pilot)
- Capacity: 1 chief of stick + 28 troops or 5,670 kg (12,500 lb) payload
- Length: 19.5 m (64 ft 0 in)
- Height: 4.6 m (15 ft 1 in)
- Empty weight: 5,330 kg (11,751 lb)
- Gross weight: 11,000 kg (24,251 lb)
- Max takeoff weight: 11,200 kg (24,692 lb)
- Powerplant: 2 × Turboméca Makila 2A1 turboshaft engines, 1,776 kW (2,382 hp) each
- Main rotor diameter: 16.20 m (53 ft 2 in)
- Main rotor area: 206.1 m^{2} (2,218 sq ft)

Performance

- Maximum speed: 324 km/h (201 mph, 175 kn) in level flight
- Cruise speed: 262 km/h (163 mph, 141 kn)
- Never exceed speed: 324 km/h (201 mph, 175 kn)
- Range: 920 km (570 mi, 500 nmi)
- Ferry range: 1,253 km (779 mi, 677 nmi)
- Service ceiling: 6,095 m (19,997 ft)
- Rate of climb: 7.4 m/s (1,460 ft/min)

== Family tree ==
  - SA330 Puma – (France)
    - Atlas Oryx – (South Africa)
      - Denel Rooivalk – (South Africa)
    - IAR 330 – (Romania)
    - IPTN NAS 330J (Indonesia)
    - Westland Puma HC.1 (United Kingdom)
  - Eurocopter AS332 Super Puma – (France) (H215 Super Puma)
    - Eurocopter AS532 Cougar – (France) (H215M Caracal)
    - KAI KUH-1 Surion – (South Korea)
  - Eurocopter EC725 – (France) (H225M Caracal)
    - Eurocopter EC225 Super Puma – (France) (EC225 Super Puma Mk2)

== See also ==
Related development

- Atlas Oryx
- Aérospatiale SA 330 Puma
- Eurocopter AS332 Super Puma
- Eurocopter EC225 Super Puma
- Eurocopter AS532 Cougar
- KAI KUH-1 Surion

Aircraft of comparable role, configuration, and era

- Sikorsky S-92 (Sikorsky CH-148 Cyclone)
- AgustaWestland AW101 (Lockheed Martin VH-71 Kestrel and AgustaWestland CH-149 Cormorant)
- Mil Mi-38
- NHIndustries NH90
- Sikorsky MH-60R Seahawk
- HAL Medium Lift Helicopter
- Harbin Z-20

Related lists

- List of rotorcraft
- Utility aircraft
