= Eurocopter AS532 Cougar =

Utility helicopter

AS532 Cougar H215M
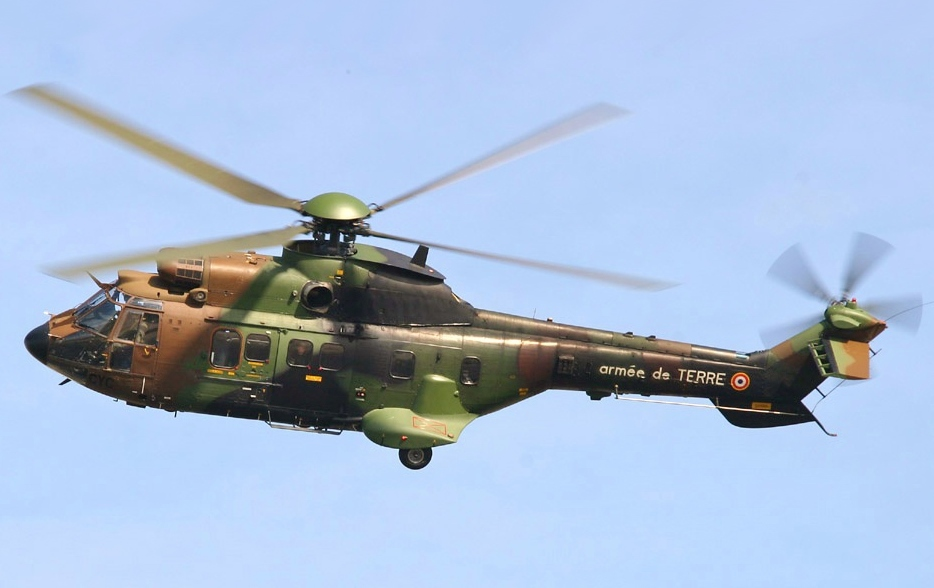
- Eurocopter AS532 of the French Army

General information
- Type: Medium utility military helicopter
- National origin: France
- Manufacturer: Aérospatiale; Eurocopter; Airbus Helicopters
- Status: In service
- Primary users: French Air and Space Force Bulgarian Air Force; Turkish Air Force; Royal Netherlands Air and Space Force; Romanian Naval Forces

History
- Manufactured: 1977–present
- Introduction date: 1978
- First flight: September 1977
- Developed from: Aérospatiale SA 330 Puma
- Variant: Eurocopter AS332 Super Puma
- Developed into: Eurocopter EC725

The Airbus Helicopters H215M (formerly Eurocopter AS532 Cougar) is a twin-engine, medium-weight, multipurpose helicopter developed by Eurocopter. The AS532 is a development and upgrade of the Aérospatiale SA 330 Puma in its militarized form. Its civilian counterpart is the Eurocopter AS332 Super Puma (later renamed the Airbus Helicopters H215). The AS532 has been further developed into the Eurocopter EC225M.

== Design and development ==
The AS332 Super Puma, designed as a growth version to replace the SA 330 Puma, first flew in September 1977. It was fitted with two 1,330 kW Turbomeca Makila 1A1 turboshaft engines, composite rotor blades, improved landing gear and a modified tailfin.

In 1990 all military Super Puma designations were changed from "AS 332" to "AS 532 Cougar" to distinguish between the civil and military variants of the helicopter.

Canada had considered purchasing the Cougar to replace their CH-113 Labrador, but opted in the end to purchase the CH-149 Cormorant. In 2012 France began a €288.8m project (€11.1m/unit) to upgrade 23 Army Cougars and 3 for the Air Force to address obsolescence issues and to deliver similar avionics to their EC225 and EC725 helicopters.

== Variants ==
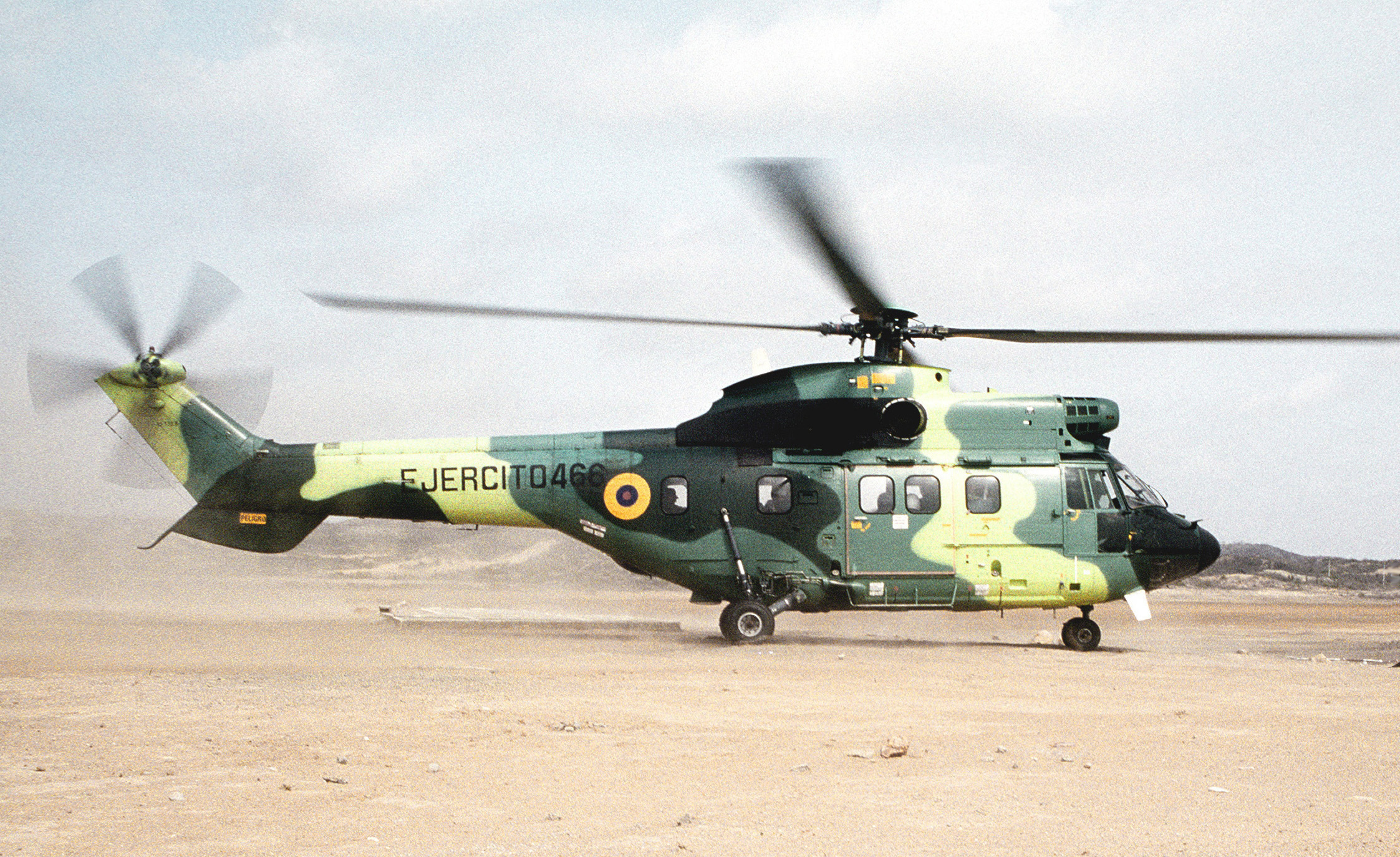
An Ecuadorian Army Cougar

AS532 UL/AL
The AS 532 UL/AL is the long version of the Cougar family and is powered by two Turbomeca Makila 1A1 turboshaft engines. It carries a crew of 2 and up to 29 troops or 6 injured passengers on stretchers plus 10 others. As with the other versions of the Cougar, the AS 532 UL/AL can lift 4.5 tons by means of a sling. The Horizon battlefield ground surveillance system can be installed on the AS 532 UL (utility version). The AS 532 AL (armed version) can also be fitted with a variety of weapons, including pod-mounted 20 mm cannons, 68 mm rocket-launchers, and side-mounted rapid fire machine-guns.

AS532 SC
The AS 532SC is the naval version of the Cougar family and is powered by two Turbomeca Makila 1A1 turboshaft engines. This version is mainly used for anti-surface unit warfare (ASUW), fitted with AM 39 Exocet missiles; Anti-submarine warfare (ASW), fitted with a variable-depth sonar and torpedoes; Search and rescue; and Sea patrols. For deck landing, securing at high sea states, maneuver and traverse this variant can be fitted with ASIST.

AS535
It was variant offered to cover the combat search and rescue (CSAR or RESCO in French) needs of the French Army. The military preferred to acquire the improved version of the aircraft, the Eurocopter EC725 instead to fulfill this gap.

HM-3
Brazilian Army designation for the AS532M1.

== Operators ==
Albania

- Albanian Air Force

Brazil

- Brazilian Army

Bulgaria

- Bulgarian Air Force

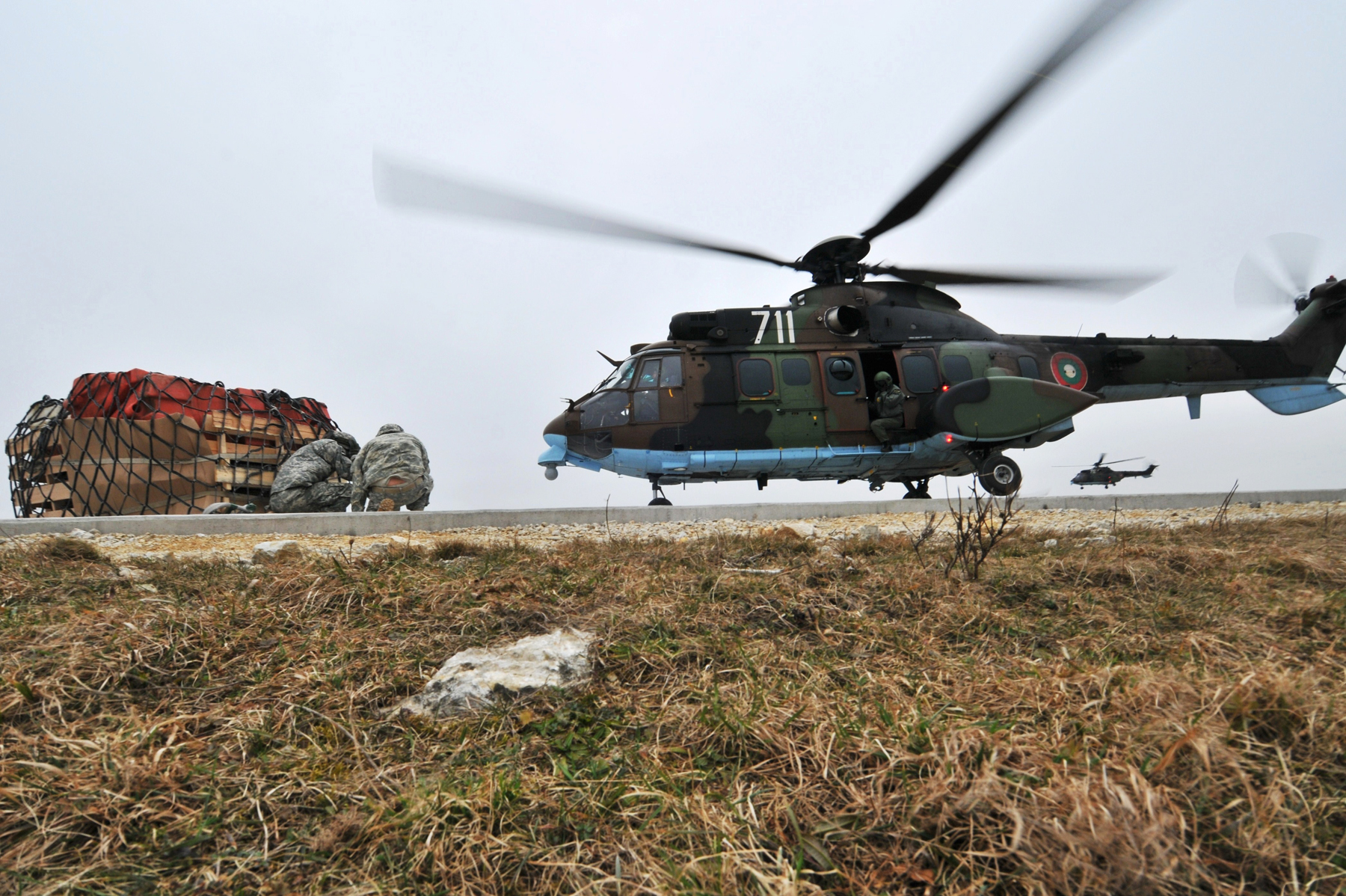
Bulgarian Eurocopter Cougar

Chile

- Chilean Army
- Chilean Navy

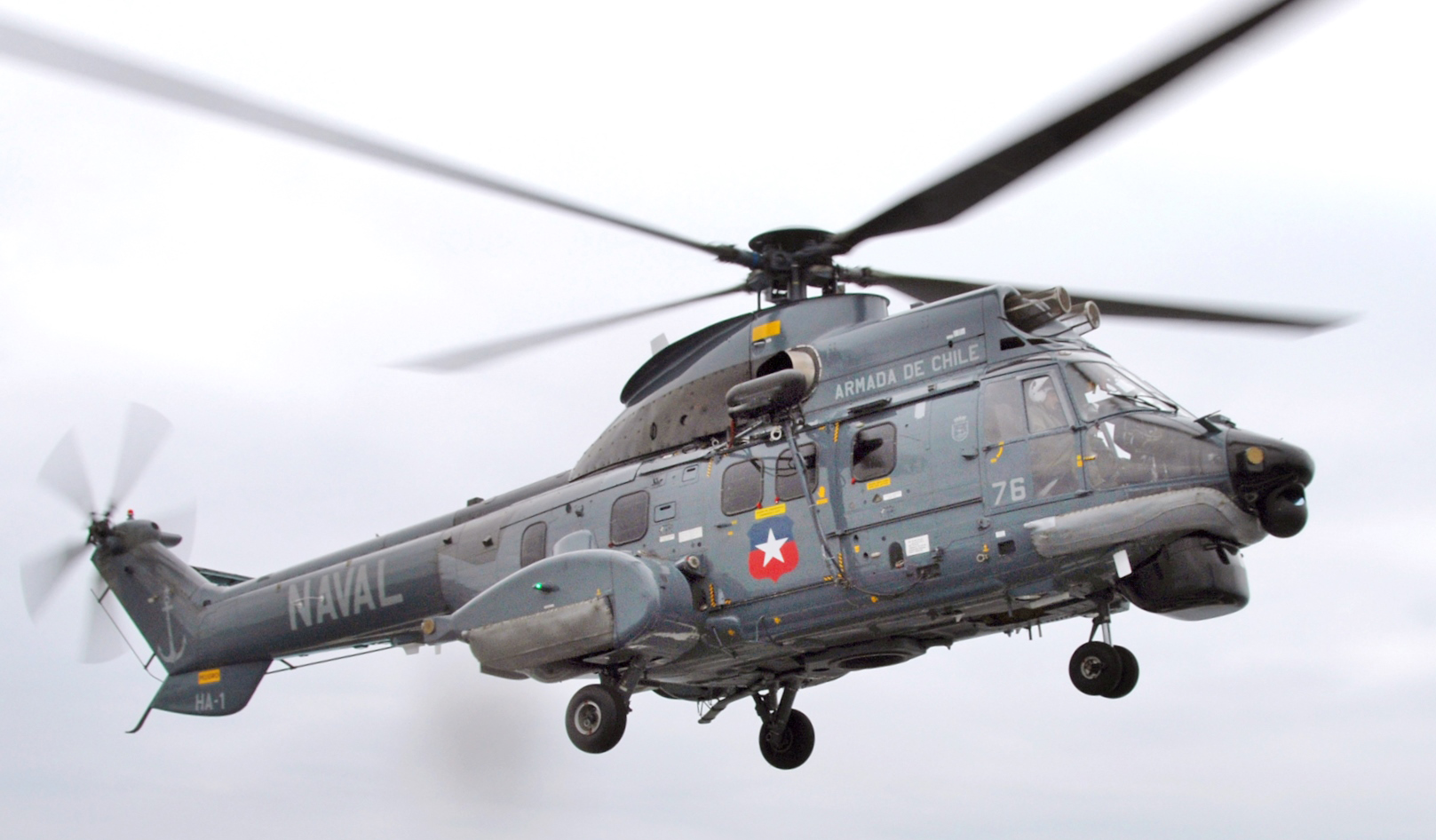
A Chilean Navy AS532

Ecuador

- Ecuadorian Army

France

- French Army

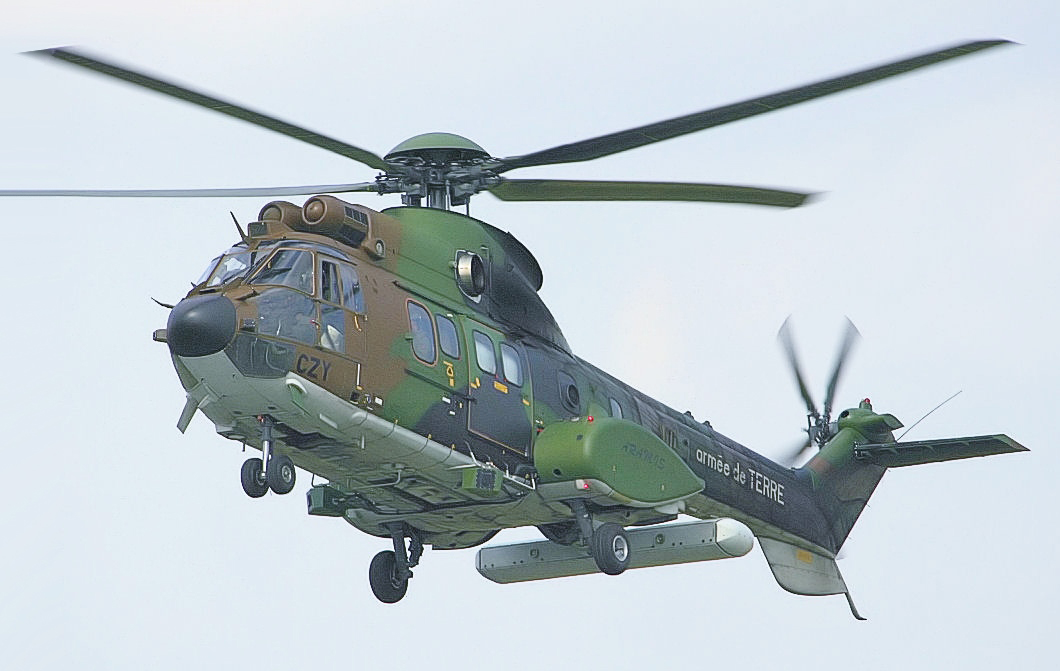
A French Army AS532 Cougar

Germany

- German Air Force

Kurdistan Region

- Kurdistan Counter Terrorism Group (CTG)

Netherlands

- Royal Netherlands Air and Space Force

Romania

- Romanian Naval Forces

Saudi Arabia

- Royal Saudi Air Force
- Royal Saudi Navy

Slovenia

- Slovenian Air Force

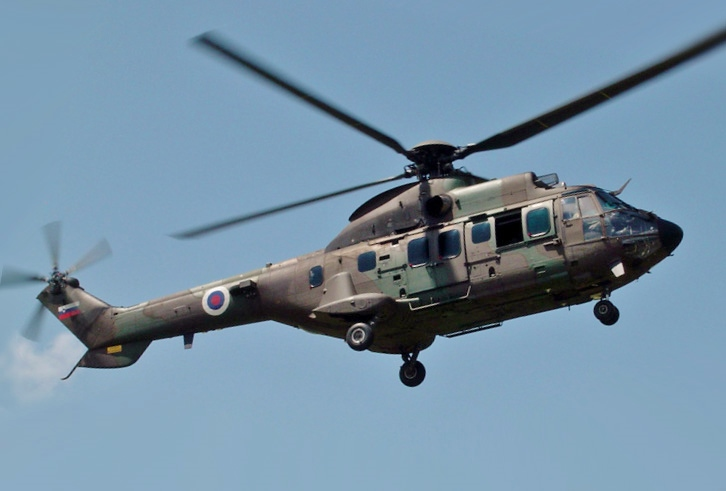
Eurocopter Cougar of the Slovenian Air Force.

Spain

- Spanish Army

Switzerland

- Swiss Air Force

Turkey

- Turkish Air Force
- Turkish Army

Uzbekistan

- Uzbekistan Air Force

Venezuela

- Venezuelan Air Force

=== Former operator ===
Zimbabwe

- Air Force of Zimbabwe

== Accidents ==
- On 4 June 1997, 11 military personnel were killed in Turkey when a Cougar helicopter was shot down with a 9K32 Strela-2 during an operation against the PKK near the Zap region, near Turkey's border with Iraq.
- On 29 April 2003, 4 military personnel were killed when a Cougar helicopter crashed into power lines during a training flight, in Isparta Turkey.
- On 25 July 2012, a Cougar helicopter during test flight has crashed in Southeastern France in a region called Verdon Gorge. The aircraft was bordered with test pilots and engineers of the manufacturer. The tragic incident killed 6 company personnel. The aircraft crashed was destined to the Albanian Armed Forces.
- On 1 June 2017, 13 military personnel were killed in Turkey when a Cougar helicopter crashed into power lines shortly after take-off from a base near Turkey's border with Iraq.
- On 25 November 2019, 13 French military personnel were killed in northern Mali when a Eurocopter Tiger helicopter collided with a Eurocopter AS532 Cougar.
- On 15 April 2020, a Cougar helicopter operated by the French Army crashed during a training exercise. The crash caused the death of 2 military personnel on board and injured other 5.
- On 4 March 2021 a Cougar helicopter crashed during severe weather conditions in eastern Turkey, killing 11 military personnel on board and injuring two others. The victims included Lt. Gen. Osman Erbas, a highly ranked army corps commander. Nine of the victims died at the crash site, while two died of their injuries in hospital.

== Specifications (AS532 UB) ==
Orthographically projected diagram of the AS332 Super Puma

Data from Brassey's World Aircraft & Systems Directory

General characteristics

- Crew: 2
- Capacity: 20 troops / 4,650 kg (10,251 lb) payload
- Length: 15.53 m (50 ft 11 in)
- Height: 4.92 m (16 ft 2 in)
- Empty weight: 4,350 kg (9,590 lb)
- Max takeoff weight: 9,000 kg (19,842 lb)
- Powerplant: 2 × Turbomeca Makila 1A1 turboshaft engines, 1,357 kW (1,820 hp) each
- Main rotor diameter: 15.6 m (51 ft 2 in)
- Main rotor area: 206 m^{2} (2,220 sq ft)

Performance

- Maximum speed: 249 km/h (155 mph, 134 kn)
- Cruise speed: 239 km/h (149 mph, 129 kn)
- Never exceed speed: 278 km/h (173 mph, 150 kn)
- Range: 573 km (356 mi, 309 nmi)
- Service ceiling: 3,450 m (11,320 ft)
- Rate of climb: 7.2 m/s (1,420 ft/min)

== Family tree ==
  - SA330 Puma – (France)
    - Atlas Oryx – (South Africa)
      - Denel Rooivalk – (South Africa)
    - IAR 330 – (Romania)
    - IPTN NAS 330J (Indonesia)
    - Westland Puma HC.1 (United Kingdom)
  - Eurocopter AS332 Super Puma – (France) (H215 Super Puma)
    - Eurocopter AS532 Cougar – (France) (H215M Caracal)
    - KAI KUH-1 Surion – (South Korea)
  - Eurocopter EC725 – (France) (H225M Caracal)
    - Eurocopter EC225 Super Puma – (France) (EC225 Super Puma Mk2)

== See also ==
Related development

- Aérospatiale SA 330 Puma
- Eurocopter AS332 Super Puma
- Eurocopter EC225 Super Puma
- Eurocopter EC725

Aircraft of comparable role, configuration, and era

- Mil Mi-38
- Mil Mi-17
- NHIndustries NH90
- Sikorsky S-92
- Sikorsky UH-60 Black Hawk

Related lists

- List of rotorcraft
