= R116 =

R116 may refer to:

- R116 road (Ireland)
- 2017 Irish Coast Guard Rescue 116 crash, a helicopter that crashed
- R-116, another name for hexafluoroethane, a fluorine compound and greenhouse gas
