= Blackrock Island, County Mayo =

Rocky Island in Ireland

Blackrock
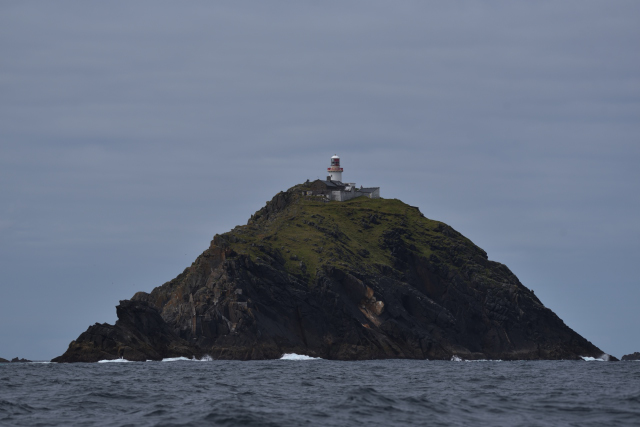

- Location within Ireland

Geography
- Location: Off coast of County Mayo, Ireland
- Coordinates: 54.0669°N 10.3205°W
- Length: 0.4 km (0.25 mi)
- Width: 0.25 km (0.155 mi)
- Highest point: 82 metres (269 ft) (approximate)

Administration
- IRL

Demographics
- Population: Uninhabited
- Black Rock lighthouse
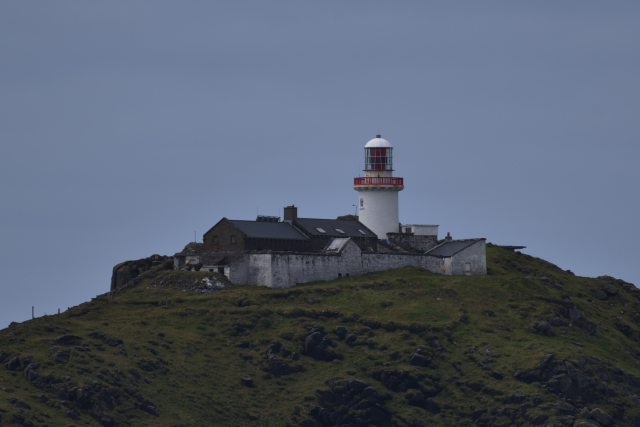
- Constructed: 1864
- Construction: local stone from island
- Automated: 1974
- Height: 15 m (49 ft)
- Shape: cylinder
- Markings: White
- Operator: Commissioners of Irish Lights
- First lit: 1864
- Focal height: 86 m (282 ft)
- Range: 19 nmi (35 km; 22 mi) (white), 14 nmi (26 km; 16 mi) (red)
- Characteristic: Fl WR 12s

Blackrock Island (54°4′0.67″N 10°19′12.66″W; Irish: An Tor) is a rocky island rising to a height of 70 metres above sea level and located northwest of Achill Island approximately 12 miles west of Blacksod Bay. Typical rainfall is 72 inches per annum, and the island is often shrouded in mist. It is visible from near the Glosh Tower on the Mullet Peninsula, and, with reference to the other islands in the area, is sometimes described as the "one that looks like a volcano".

There is a small rocky islet 125 m to the east with a length of 80 m. There are about five rocky islets including Fish Rock, Carrickaduff and Carrackabrown spread 1 km to 2 km in a generally westwards direction.

== Toponymy ==
It is known locally as Tór Mór, and is known as "Black Rock" by Irish Lights.

== Waters around Blackrock Island ==
The waters around Blackrock Island are noted for large ocean swells and waves, as evidenced by the difficulties faced in relieving the lighthouse keepers and with Rescue 116 helicopter wreckage recovery in 2017. Water depths descend to 40 m within a kilometre of the island, with depths of 60 m and lower more typical towards Achill Island. The Blackrock grounds are popular with sea anglers due to the attracting of larger fish species: blue shark; porbeagle; halibut and bluefin tuna.

== Blackrock Lighthouse ==
The lighthouse on Blackrock Island was constructed in 1864. The tower was built of stone quarried from the rock on which it stands; the keepers' dwelling is contiguous. It is a 50-foot-high round stone tower with lantern and gallery attached to a single storey keeper's house. The lighthouse is painted white. It is one of Ireland's most remote lighthouses and the most westerly lighthouse off the Mayo Coast. Keepers and their families lived on the rock for 29 years, until dwellings were built at Blacksod, on the mainland, and the station made relieving, in 1893.

It was converted to automatic in 1974 after which the island became uninhabited. The lighthouse was converted to solar power in 1999. The resident lighthouse keeper of Blacksod Lighthouse on the mainland, which is still staffed, is also responsible for maintaining the Blackrock lighthouse. Inspection and maintenance visits are periodically made by helicopter (via a helipad on the island), the only way to get to the island on a regular basis. In order to accommodate work-crews on extended maintenance and repair jobs at the lighthouse, one of the old keeper's houses has been restored.

According to Irish writer and broadcaster Bill Long, it is reputed to be "the most difficult (Irish) Rock on which to land; totally inaccessible at times, either by boat, or by helicopter..."

"Three generations of lighthouse keepers will attest to this, having waited for several weeks, sometimes months, to be taken off, at the end of their stint on duty there. It is a bleak, barren, inhospitable place, wracked by prevailing Westerly winds, pounded by huge Atlantic seas. For this rock is near the edge of the Continental Shelf, and lies directly in the path of the enormous swell that sweeps inexorably landward..."

== Accidents and incidents associated with the island ==
=== Loss of lighthouse keeper in 1937 ===
In September 1937 the then lighthouse-keeper, Patrick Monaghan, was swept from the lighthouse by a freak wave. The visit of his descendants to the island is described in the RTÉ Radio 1 documentary Good Day at Blackrock.

=== Attack by German bomber in 1940 ===
On 20 August 1940, a German bomber attacked the SS Macville which was passing close to the island and damaged several lantern panes and the roof. A Focke-Wulf Fw 200 Condor of Kampfgeschwader 40 was claimed to have dropped two SD250 bombs and damaged a freighter southwest of Blacksod (possibly Macville) on this date, with other sources confirming damage to Macville.

=== Stranding of keepers in 1942-1943 ===
Three lighthouse keepers were stranded on Blackrock Island in the winter of 1942-1943 during the Emergency in World War II. Storms were particularly ferocious in this period and the landing stage and associated derricks were destroyed in the gales. The keepers, who normally expected to be supplied every 10 days, and had started with reduced supplies due to being subject to rationing in the emergency, were at points critically low on supplies. Captain John Padden made several resupply attempts at considerable risk and supply baskets were on a few occasions successfully thrown to the island. On 17 February 1943, in a short lull in the weather he was able to relieve Walter Coupe (117 days) and Michael O'Conner (~ 90 days). Jack Scott, the principal keeper, remained to direct recovery operations.

=== Crash of Rescue 116 in 2017 ===
On 14 March 2017 the Irish coast guard Rescue R116 helicopter impacted the island with the wreckage coming to rest in 40 m of water south west of the island with four persons lost.

The preliminary report of the Air Accident Investigation Unit had found that (as of March 2017) Blackrock Island had been omitted or had an incorrect and significantly lower height in some terrain and obstacle databases.

== Sources ==
- Long, Bill (1993). Bright Light, White Water. The Story of Irish Lighthouses and their People. Dublin: New Island Books. ISBN 1-874597-40-5.
