= Blacksod Lighthouse =

Lighthouse in County Mayo, Ireland

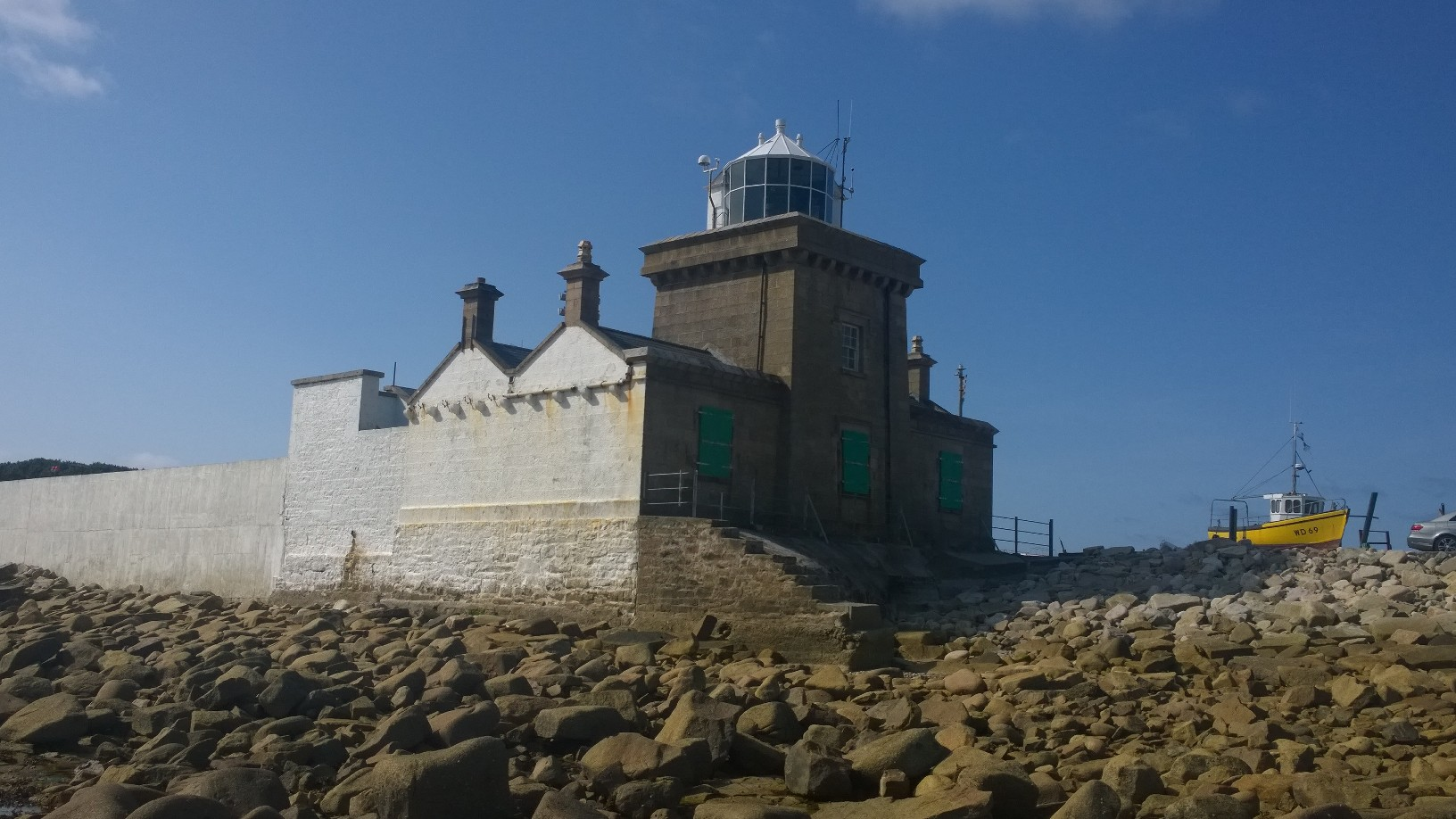
- Blacksod in 2015
- Location: Mullet Peninsula, Blacksod Point, County Mayo, Ireland
- Coordinates: 54°05′55″N 10°03′37″W

Tower
- Constructed: 1864
- Construction: granite (tower)
- Automated: 1999
- Height: 12 m (39 ft)
- Shape: tower rising from a 2-story keeper's house
- Markings: Unpainted (house), white (lantern)
- Operator: Commissioners of Irish Lights

Light
- First lit: 1864
- Focal height: 13 m (43 ft)
- Range: 12 nmi (22 km; 14 mi) (white), 9 nmi (17 km; 10 mi) (red)
- Characteristic: Fl(2) WR 7.5s
- Ireland no.: CIL-1870

Blacksod Lighthouse (Gaelic: Fód Dubh) is a lighthouse at the southern end of the Mullet Peninsula, Erris, County Mayo, at the entrance to Blacksod Bay. It is made of local granite blocks, which came from the Beaufort quarries, a nearby outcrop of high-quality granite.

The keeper's house consists of single story rooms with a square tower leading to a castellated building. It was occupied by a resident lighthouse keeper. Blacksod is of unusual design for a lighthouse, being one of only two true square lighthouses in Ireland, it has small conical lantern section on top, which is painted white.

== History ==
The need for a lighthouse at the southern extremity of the Mullet peninsula was first mentioned in 1841 when all Ireland was part of the United Kingdom. A Lieutenant Nugent, an officer in the British Coastguard stationed at Belmullet, requested in a letter that a lighthouse be placed on Blackrock Island. But Inspector George Halpin, a senior civil engineer responsible for building Irish lighthouses, recommended to the Dublin Ballast Board (the predecessor to the Commissioners of Irish Lights) that a sea light should not be built on Blackrock Island but instead be sited on Blacksod Point – the southernmost point of the Mullet Peninsula – to guide vessels into Blacksod Bay.

The lighthouse at Blacksod Point was completed in 1866; the work had been funded by Bryan Carey, one of the leading merchants in Belmullet at that time. The light was first illuminated on 30 June 1866, and showed a fixed light with a red sensor over Ardelly Point. Many lighthouse keepers and their families lived at the station until on 1 November 1933, Edward (Ted) Sweeney was appointed as the live-in attendant.

In June 1944 during World War II, meteorological observations taken by Maureen Flavin (who became his wife in 1946) at the weather station attached to the lighthouse caused the Normandy landings to be postponed for a crucial 24hrs. While Ireland remained neutral, it continued to secretly telegraph weather reports to the British under an agreement in place since independence. D-Day had been scheduled to commence on 5 June 1944 but Maureen Sweeney's weather report from 3 June recorded a dramatic fall in barometric pressure. This data indicated to the Allies' chief meteorologist, Group Captain James Stagg, that an approaching storm would strike the English Channel on 5 June. The news prompted General Dwight D. Eisenhower to delay the invasion until 6 June 1944, when conditions were more favourable.

In addition to being attendant lighthouse keepers, Maureen and Ted Sweeney were also local postmasters. During the late 1970s, the post office was re-located from its original site at the old coastguard station to a new bungalow, built at the top of the Lighthouse road. While this was being built and with the permission of both Irish Lights and the Department of Posts and Telegraphs, the Blacksod Post Office was accommodated in one of the rooms under the lighthouse tower, marking the first and only time a post office formed part of a working lighthouse.

Towards the end of 1969, Blacksod became the helicopter base for Eagle Island and Blackrock Island lighthouses for the monthly visits of the attendant keepers to the lights on the two islands.

The house at Blacksod was badly damaged in 1991 when large seas broke the Southern sea wall causing damage to the radio room and store sheds. While still used today by The Commissioners of Irish Lights for helicopters visiting the offshore lighthouses Blacksod is a vital location for the Irish Coast Guard search and rescue helicopters operating off the west coast as a forward refuelling station. The lighthouse, which used to be a family home, was later opened as a visitor centre, and offers guided tours.

== Associated lighthouses ==
The keeper for Blacksod Lighthouse is also responsible for Blackrock Lighthouse at Blackrock Island. Located 12 miles west of Blacksod Bay, the lighthouse on Blackrock is automated and accessible only by helicopter. On 14 March 2017, four Irish Coast Guard personnel were killed in a crash off Blackrock Lighthouse when it was understood they were seeking to refuel at Blacksod lighthouse.

== See also ==
- List of lighthouses in Ireland

== Sources ==
- Long, Bill (1993). Bright Light, White Water. The Story of Irish Lighthouses and their People. Dublin: New Island Books. ISBN 1-874597-40-5.
- Taylor, Richard M. (2004). The Lighthouses of Ireland. A Personal History. Wilton, Cork: The Collins Press. ISBN 1-903464-59-5.
