= Eagle Island lighthouses =

Eagle Island Lighthouse West
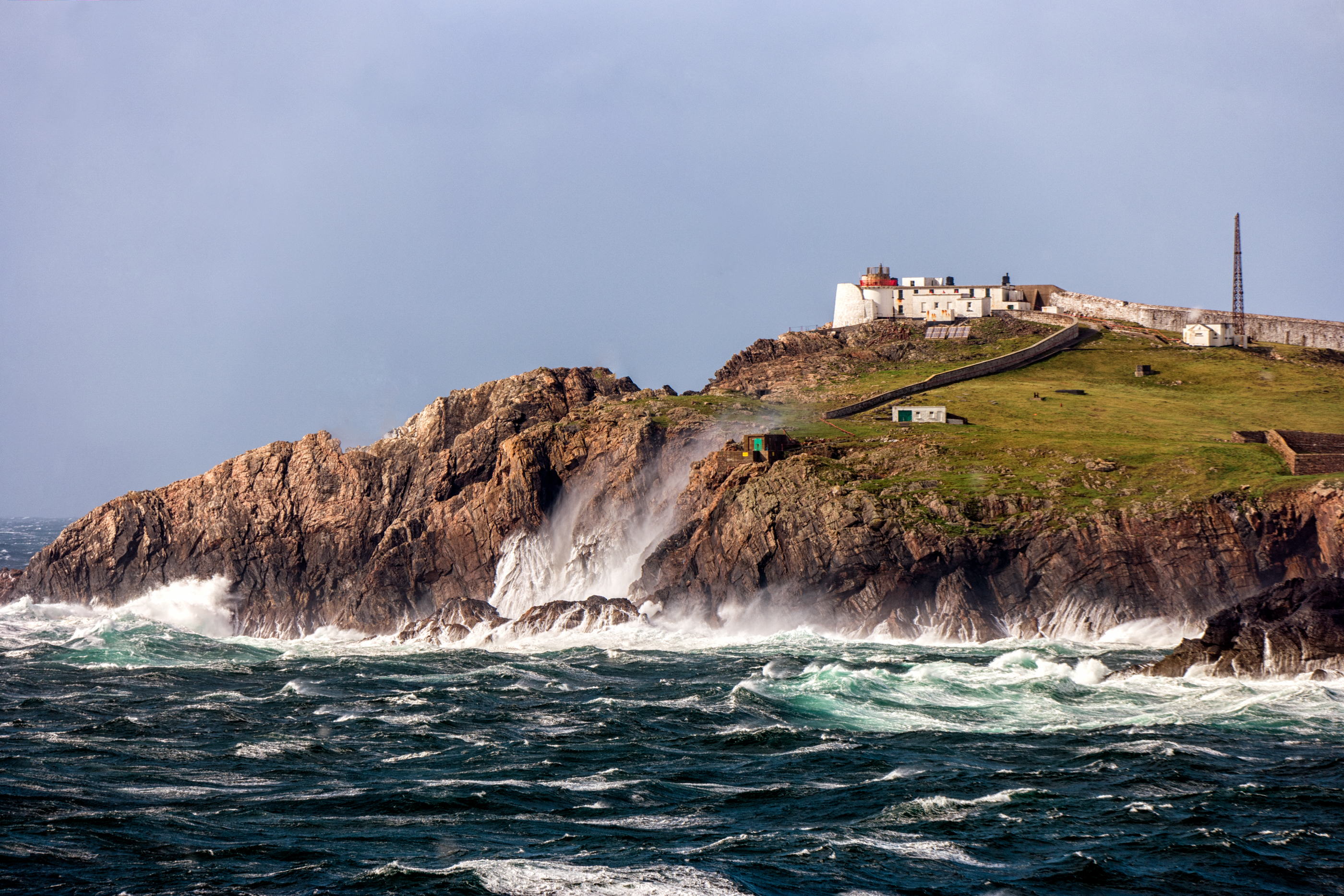
- Location: Eagle Island, Mullet Peninsula; Erris, County Mayo; Ireland
- Coordinates: 54.283302°N 10.092781°W

Tower
- Constructed: 1835
- Construction: local stone from the island tower
- Automated: 1988
- Height: 11 metres (36 ft)
- Shape: Cylindrical tower with balcony, lantern on the east tower removed
- Markings: White tower
- Operator: Commissioners of Irish Lights

Light
- Focal height: 67 metres (220 ft)
- Range: 33 km (18 nmi)
- Characteristic: Fl (3) W 20s.
- Ireland no.: CIL-1850

The Eagle Island lighthouses are a pair of lighthouses on Eagle Island, County Mayo, Ireland, of which only one remains operational.

Two lighthouses were commissioned in 1830 in response to requests from the Coastguards who were concerned at the sea conditions at Blackrock, further south. The Board inspector, however, ruled in favor of locating the new lighthouses on Eagle Island, one in the east and the other in the west, with 121 metres (132 yd) between them, at a cost of almost £40,000 (roughly £3,200,000 or €5,730,000 in 2023). Their lights were aligned at a height of 67 m (220 ft) above sea level and could be seen to the east as far as Broadhaven Bay and to the south as far as Blacksod Bay. The lighthouses became operational in September 1835.

Eagle Island is located close to the edge of the Continental Shelf and is constantly pounded by powerful waves from the Atlantic. When the lighthouses were first built in the 19th century there were two lighthouses and seven dwelling houses on Eagle Island, according to the 1841 census. By the 1911 census, there was only one dwelling house listed on the island. Despite the erection of a massive storm wall to protect the lighthouses, the lights were repeatedly hit by waves coming off the Atlantic.

Although the lighthouse sites sit almost 60 m (200 ft) above the high water mark, during a severe storm on 17 January 1836, a rock was thrown up the cliffs and smashed the glass in a window 27 m (87 ft) high up in the tower building. On 11 March 1861 at midday the light room of the East tower was struck by a rogue wave, smashing 23 panes, washing some of the lamps down the stairs, and damaging the reflectors with broken glass beyond repair. The light was restored the following night with a reduced number of lamps and reflectors. So much water cascaded down the tower in the incident that it was impossible for the keepers to open the door at the base, and they had to drill holes in it to let the water out.

Storms constantly batter the lighthouse at Eagle Island and gradually it was realized that Eagle Island was not well suited to human habitation. The families on the island were rehoused near to Corclough on the mainland at the end of the 19th century, although lighthouse keepers remained resident. On 31 March 1988 the lighthouse was made automatic and there have been no lighthouse keepers resident on the island since.

== See also ==
- List of lighthouses in Ireland
