= Sikorsky S-92 =

Transport helicopter family by Sikorsky

S-92 / H-92 Superhawk
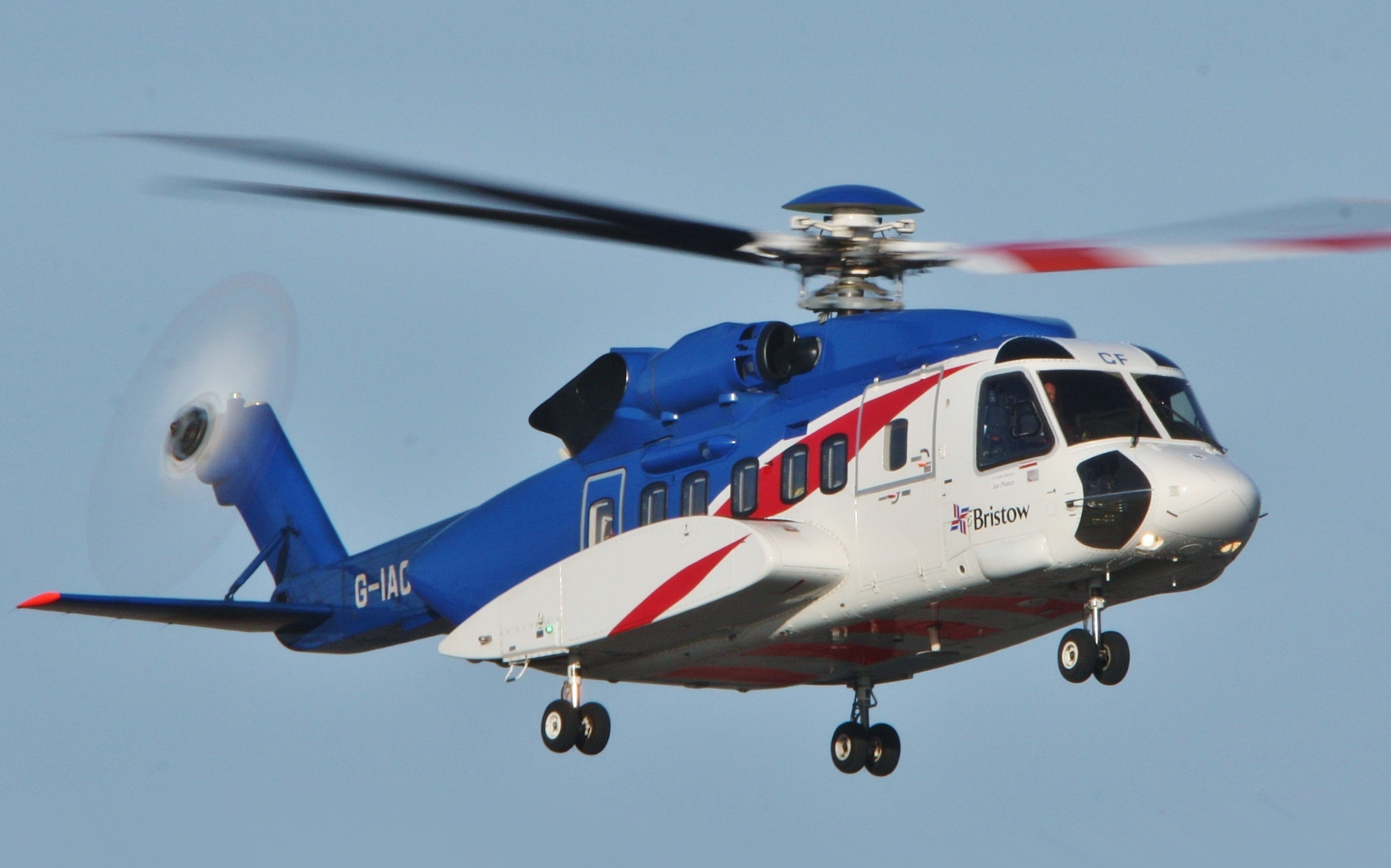
- An S-92 of Bristow Helicopters

General information
- Type: Medium-lift transport/utility helicopter
- National origin: United States
- Manufacturer: Sikorsky Aircraft
- Status: In service
- Primary users: CHC Helicopter Petroleum Helicopters International; Bristow Helicopters; Cougar Helicopters
- Number built: at least 300

History
- Manufactured: 1998–present
- Introduction date: 2004
- First flight: December 23, 1998
- Developed from: Sikorsky S-70
- Variants: Sikorsky CH-148 Cyclone; Sikorsky VH-92

The Sikorsky S-92 is an American twin-engine medium-lift helicopter built by Sikorsky Aircraft for the civil and military helicopter markets. The S-92 was developed from the Sikorsky S-70 helicopter and has similar parts, such as flight control and rotor systems.

The H-92 Superhawk is a military version of the S-92 in the utility transport role, capable of carrying 22 troops. The H-92 can also be configured for specific missions, including search and rescue and executive transportation. The CH-148 Cyclone is a shipboard maritime helicopter variant developed for the Royal Canadian Air Force to support naval operations of the Royal Canadian Navy. The Sikorsky VH-92 is a variant under development to replace the United States Marine Corps' Marine One U.S. Presidential transport fleet.

== Development ==
After the 1973 oil crisis, major oil and gas companies began exploration further offshore, thus creating a need for aircraft such as the S-92 with sufficient capability.

Sikorsky Aircraft first displayed a S-92 mockup of the planned helicopter in 1992. The S-92 was to be offered for sale beginning in 1993, but due to a decline in the international market for helicopters, this was delayed. In 1995 Sikorsky formed Team S-92 with international partners and launched the helicopter program at the Paris Airshow that year. Sikorsky developed the S-92 to compete with civil aircraft such as the Aerospatiale/Eurocopter Super Puma. The helicopter uses a new airframe with dynamic components based on the S-70/H-60 components. The S-92 took its maiden flight on December 23, 1998 at the Sikorsky Development Flight Center, West Palm Beach, Florida.

In July 2000, Sikorsky announced design changes to the S-92. The fuselage of prototype #3 was lengthened by 16 in (40 cm) aft of the cockpit, the tail pylon was shortened by 41 in (1.04 m), and the horizontal stabilizer was repositioned from the left side opposite the tail rotor to the right side at the base of the tail pylon. The modifications to the tail solved a pitch stability issue discovered during flight testing, and were reported to allow the aircraft to meet a key requirement of the Nordic Standard Helicopter Program (NSHP) for shipboard stowage. The lengthening of the fuselage and shortening of the tail pylon shifted the aircraft center of gravity (CG) forward, permitting a more level attitude in flight. The longer fuselage allowed for an additional row of three seats, as well as a larger passenger door option for Search and Rescue (SAR) customers. Sikorsky incorporated the changes into the following two prototypes as the production standard configuration. Some reports suggested that the modifications were actually to resolve damage from structural design flaws.

The S-92 is built and customized in Sikorsky's Coatesville, Pennsylvania facility. The S-92 received Federal Aviation Administration (FAA) part 29 type certification on December 19, 2002, and received International European Aviation Safety Agency/Joint Aviation Authorities (EASA/JAA) certification on June 8, 2004.

=== Tata–Sikorsky Aerospace Limited ===
In February 2007, the then United Technologies Corporation's subsidiary, Sikorsky Aircraft Corporation and India's Tata Advanced Systems (TASL) signed a Memorandum of Understanding (MoU) to create opportunities for aerospace operations in India. On June 12, 2009, Sikorsky signed an agreement with TASL for manufacturing helicopter cabins of S-92(R) in India for export and domestic markets. The first cabin would be delivered in late 2010 from a new greenfield manufacturing facility near Hyderabad, the then capital of Andhra Pradesh. On November 12, the companies signed another agreement to form a joint venture (which led to the formation Tata–Sikorsky Aerospace Limited) to manufacture aerospace components in India. The venture would be open to manufacture components for other OEMs in the aerospace sector as well. The joint venture's operations would be based in a second greenfield facility beside the cabin manufacturing building. The construction of the second facility, initially meant for production of over 5,000 "detailed aerospace components", is scheduled for completion by 2011 with production commencing from 2012.

The first consignment of S-92 cabins was delivered in November 2010. The facility is located in the Special Economic Zone (SEZ) in Adibatla. As of April 2012, Sikorsky planned to double the manufacturing capacity of helicopter cabins in the Hyderabad facility. The enhanced capacity would be enhanced in a phased manner with two cabins per month in June 2012 and then to 3 cabins per month or 36 units annually in December 2013. The workforce would be increased to match the planned capacity. As of May 2015, the joint venture was also producing 4,000 components besides the cabins which is expected to achieve an indigenous content of 80% by 2013. There were also plans to establish a helicopter manufacturing facility with a capacity of 2–3 S-92 helicopters monthly after 2015–16 in addition to other manufacturing facilities in China, Holland, Turkey and Columbia and other South American countries. On October 24, 2013, the joint venture delivered the first fully indigenous S-92 cabin which would be then shipped to the US for final assembly and delivery. Meanwhile, the company delivered the 50th cabin earlier that month. Its production capacity had been increased to four cabins per month in the first facility along with 5,000 different components in the second facility.

== Design ==
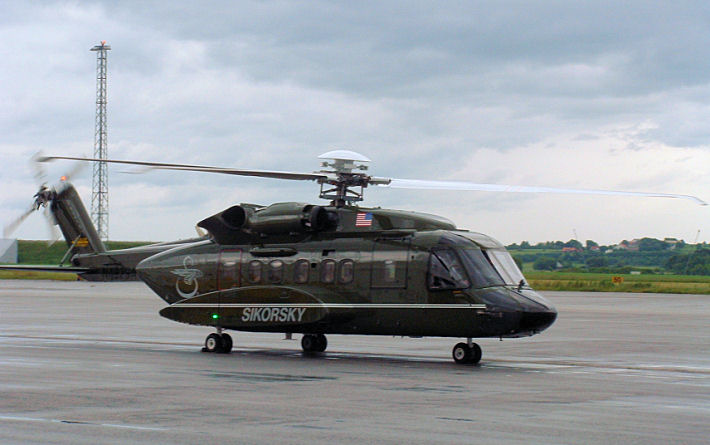
An S-92 at Sola Airport, Norway in July 2003

The S-92 is multi-purpose helicopter powered by twin GE CT7-8A turboshaft engines and has an aluminum airframe and some composite components. The four-bladed fully articulated composite main rotor blade is wider and has a longer radius than the Sikorsky S-70. The tapered blade tip sweeps back and angles downward to reduce noise and increase lift. Most of the rotor system components aside from the blades are titanium.

The S-92 features an active vibration control system, using vibration sensors and structurally mounted force generators to increase flight comfort and lower acoustic levels to below certification requirements. A 2008 study by Norway's Flymedisinsk Institute found that the S-92's vibration levels were 42 percent above that of the Eurocopter EC225 Super Puma; Sikorsky disputed this finding, saying that the study hadn't used their latest anti-vibration technology. In February 2011, as published on a Norwegian newspaper's website, the noise and vibration levels were reportedly subject to health concerns, allegedly causing tinnitus and heart problems.

A number of safety features such as flaw tolerance, bird strike capability, and engine burst containment have been incorporated into the design. Adherence to FAA FAR part 29 has led the FAA certification board to call the S-92 the "safest helicopter in the world". The S-92 was not able to meet the Federal Aviation Regulation "run dry" specification for loss of oil pressure in the main gearbox, but was certified with an exemption due to the unlikelihood of such a situation occurring; this was a factor in the fatal crash of Cougar Helicopters Flight 91 in 2009.

== Operational history ==
The S-92 received FAA certification in 2002, and International certification in June 2004. The first S-92 was delivered in late 2004 to launch customer PHI, Inc.

=== Competitions ===
Sikorsky entered a Search and rescue variant of the H-92 in U.S. Air Force's CSAR-X combat search and rescue competition beginning in 2006. Its competitors were the AgustaWestland EH101 and HH-47, but by December 2012 all other manufacturers had withdrawn. Flight International magazine expects Sikorsky to bid a version of its MH-60 special operations helicopter.

After Sikorsky successfully challenged in court the preferred supplier status of NHIndustries NH90 for the Nordic Standard Helicopter Programme an open competition was held. Sikorsky entered the S-92 as a candidate for the Norwegian All Weather Search and Rescue Helicopter (NAWSARH) that is planned to replace the Royal Norwegian Air Force Westland Sea King Mk.43B in 2015. The other candidates for the NAWSARH contract of 10 to 12 helicopters were AgustaWestland AW101, Bell Boeing V-22 Osprey, Eurocopter EC225, and NHIndustries NH90. The V-22 was eliminated from the competition in 2012. The S-92 was removed from the competition in July 2013 and was subsequently won by AgustaWestland with an order for 16 AW101s.

The S-92 competed with the Eurocopter EC225 for the UK Search and Rescue Helicopter (SAR-H) program. In February 2010, the S-92 was selected by the UK in a £6 billion deal to replace 40 Sea King search and rescue helicopters with 25 to 30 S-92s; it subsequently announced that Soteria, the preferred supplier, will not be used due to irregularities with its bid. The UK government subsequently opted for a smaller £2.5 billion contract with the Bristow Group to operate 11 S-92s (and 11 AW189s) from 10 bases.

The Irish Coast Guard replaced its Sikorsky S-61N fleet with the S-92, beginning in 2012. The aircraft are operated by CHC Helicopter.

In the wake of the deadly 2016 crash of a Eurocopter EC225 Super Puma contracted by Statoil, that company announced that it would not use that type again and instead use the Sikorsky S-92 to meet its needs, stipulating that operators it contracts with, such as CHC Helikopter Service, will be required to use such equipment.

== Variants ==
=== S-92A ===
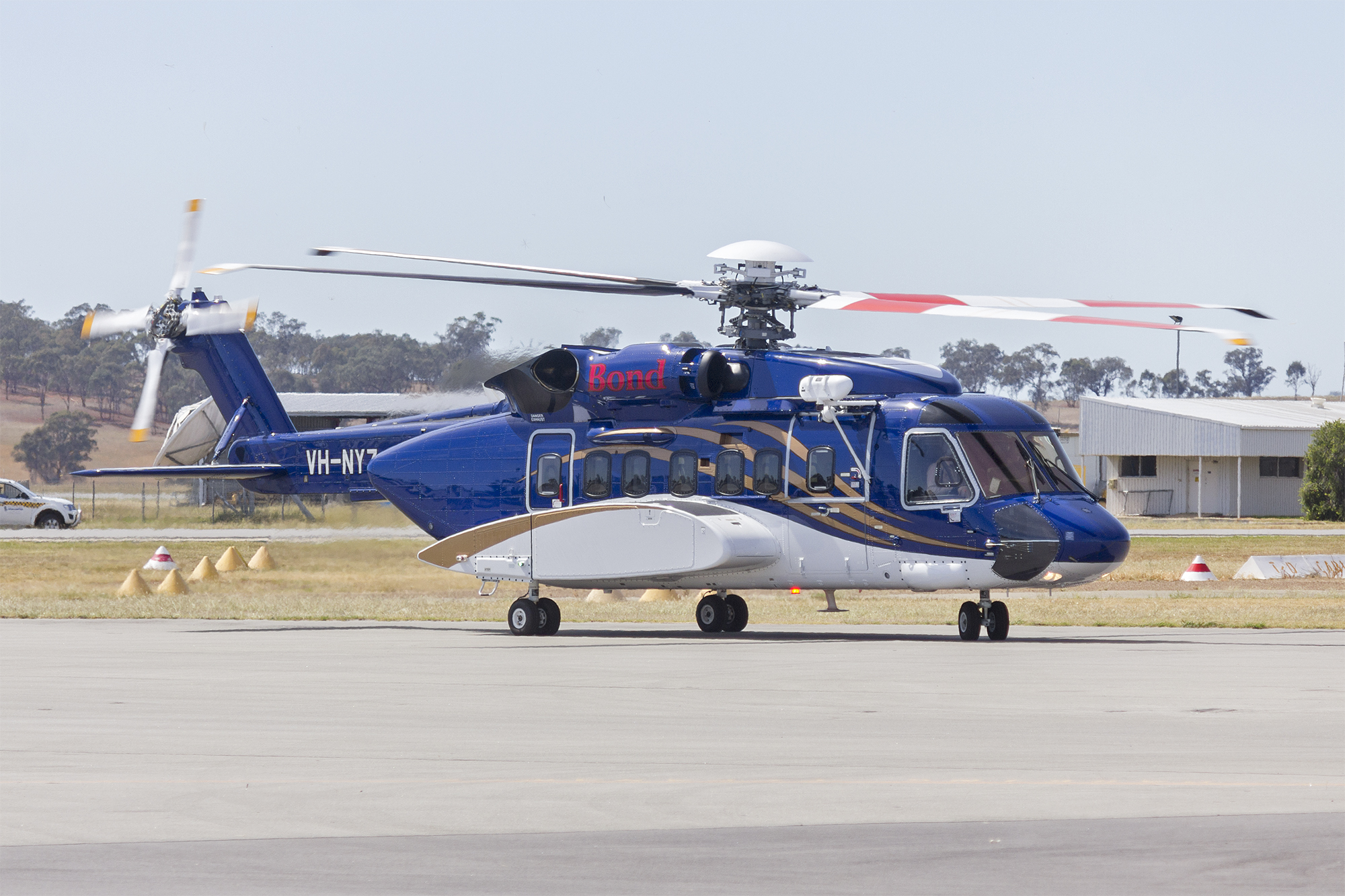
S-92A at Wagga Wagga Airport in 2015

The S-92A is the civilian variant and is available in a number of versions. The civil transport version has an airliner-type interior that seats 19 passengers. The utility transport version has 22 side-facing seats with a full cabin width rear ramp. The 700 cu ft (20 m^{3}) cabin volume can also be configured to accommodate up to three airline-style LD3 cargo containers. Additional stowage space is available in the 140 cu ft (4.0 m^{3}) volume located in the aft ramp compartment. During development it was referred to as the S-92C Helibus.

=== H-92 Superhawk ===
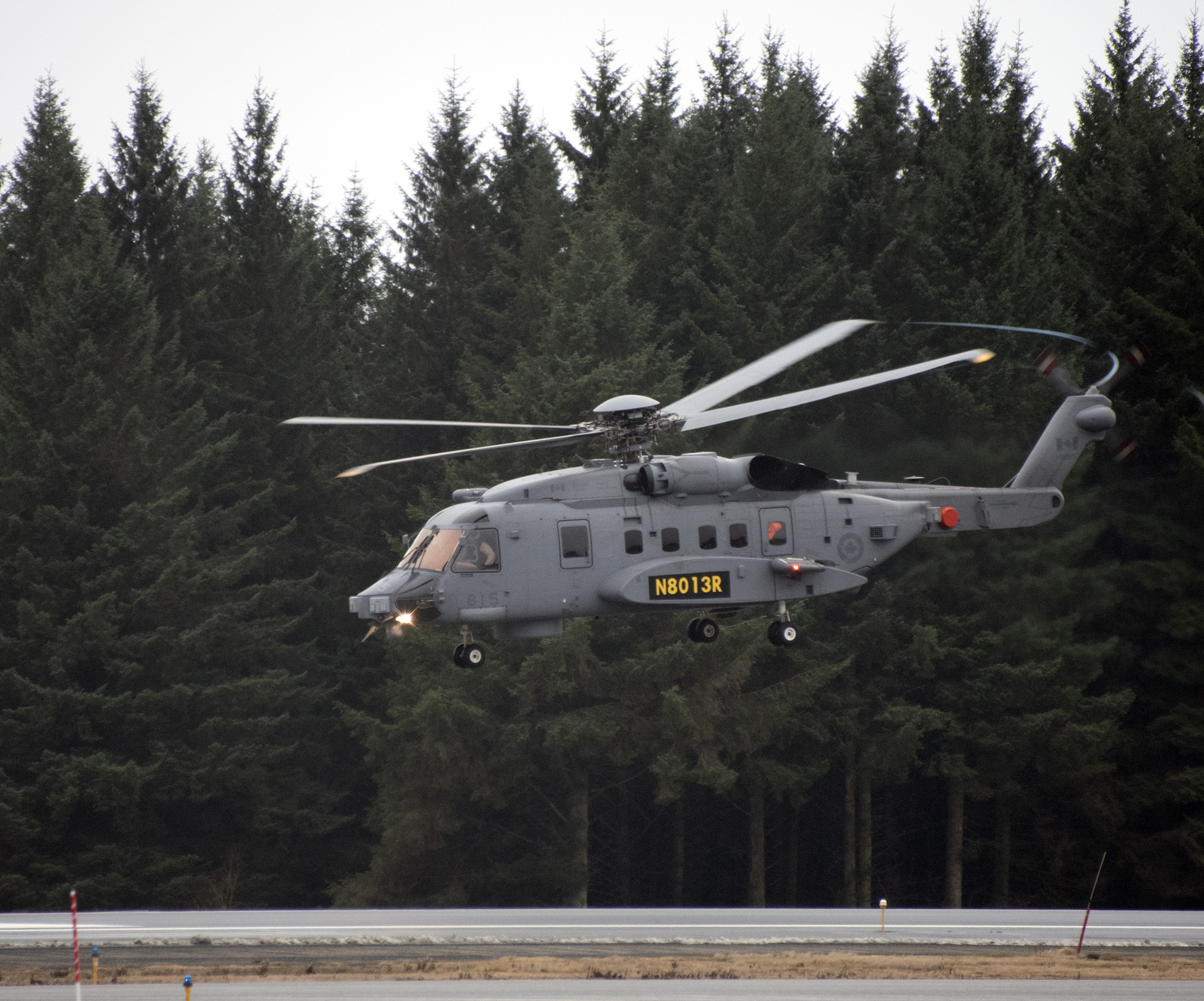
A H-92/CH-148 production for Canada

The H-92 Superhawk is the military variant of the S-92. It has been demonstrated to the U.S. Air Force, Marine Corps and Coast Guard. The H-92 has more powerful GE CT7-8C engines, rated at 3,070 shp (2,290 kW) and, unlike the S-92, has fly-by-wire flight controls. The search and rescue variant provides space for seats, litters, auxiliary fuel cell and SAR emergency equipment.

In July 2004, the H-92 Superhawk was selected by Canada for its Maritime Helicopter Programme (MHP) as the CH-148 Cyclone. Canada ordered 28 helicopters in November 2004. The program has been delayed multiple times. As of November 2019, nineteen CH-148 Cyclones have been built, delivered, and accepted by the government of Canada. The Canadian military declared initial operational capacity in June 2018, and expects full operational capacity by fall 2025.

=== VH-92 ===
The S-92A variant, designated VH-92 is used as the Marine One to fly the U.S. President.

== Operators ==
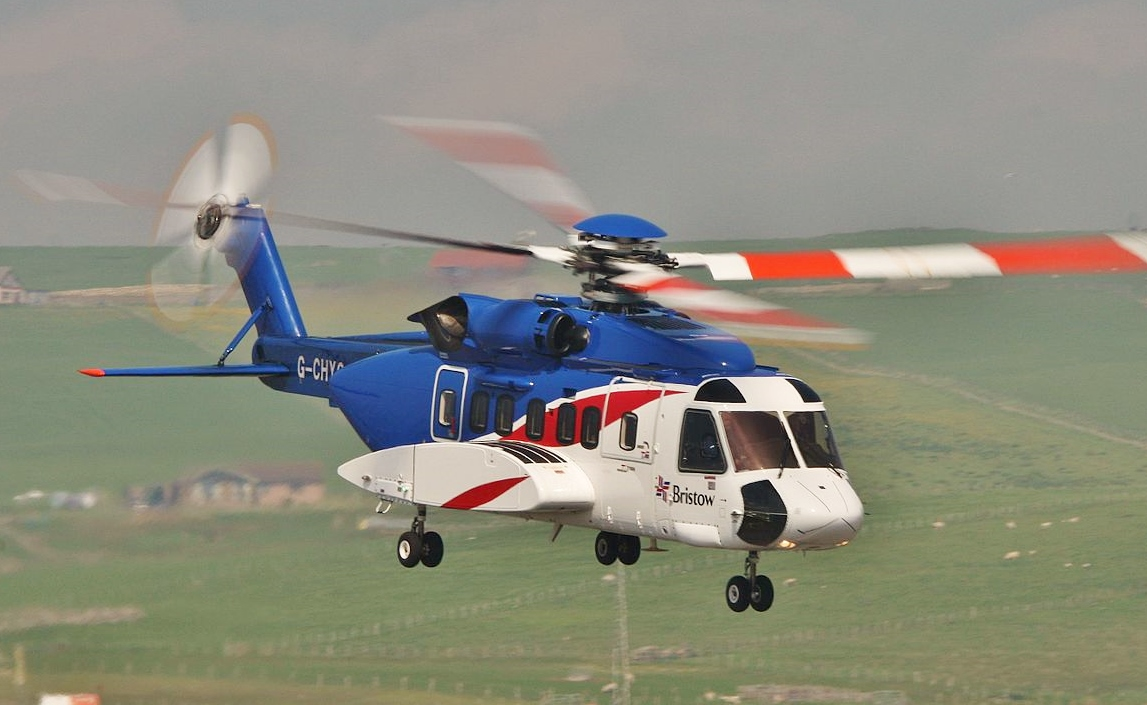
A Sikorsky S-92 from Bristow Helicopters

=== Civilian ===
Australia

- Babcock Mission Critical Services Australasia
- CHC Helicopter
- PHI International Australia

Azerbaijan

- Silk Way Airlines - 2 in use

Brazil

- Líder Aviação

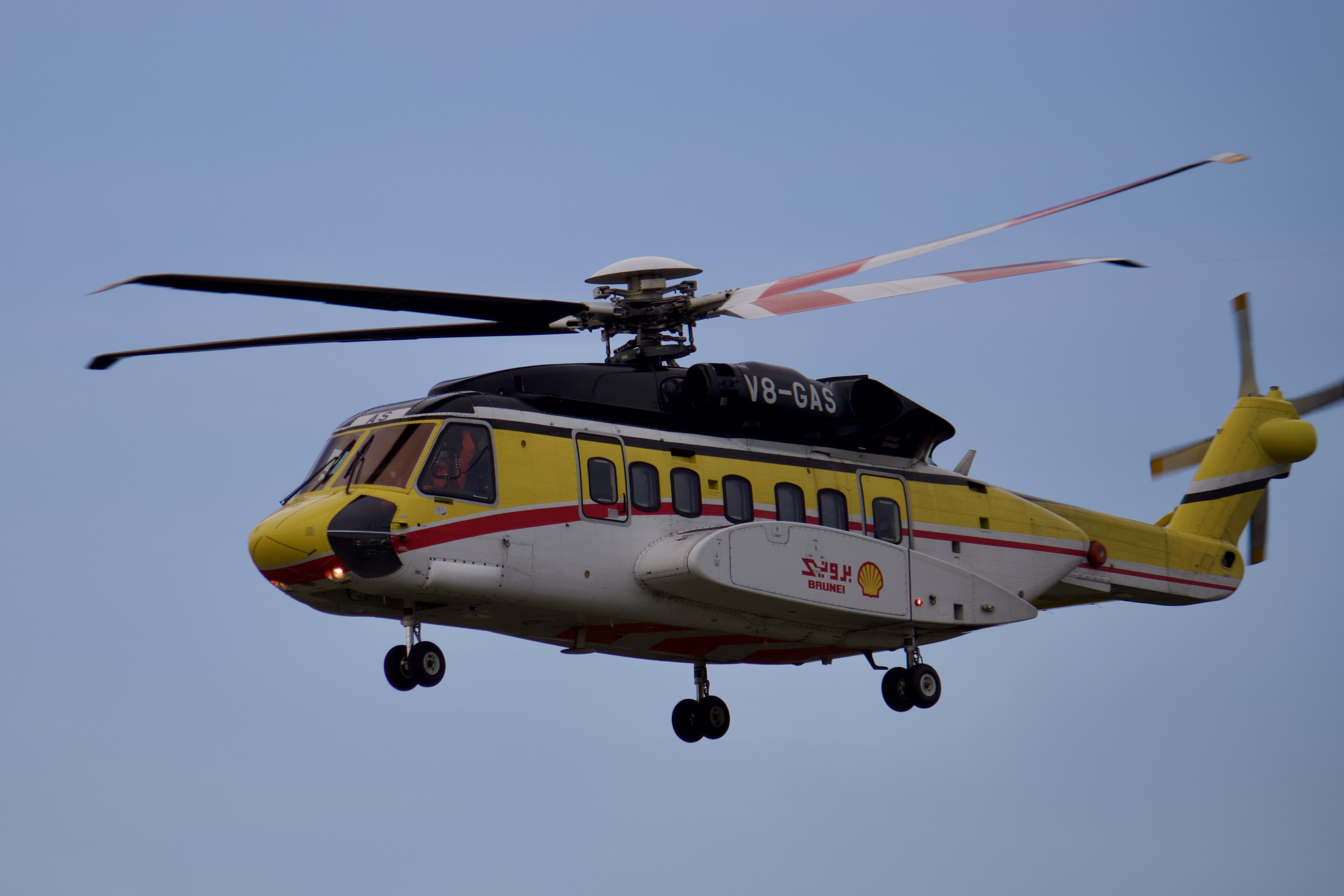
A S-92 in service with Brunei Shell Petroleum at Anduki Airfield

Brunei

- Brunei Shell Petroleum

Canada

- CHC Helicopter
- Cougar Helicopters
- VIH Helicopters

China

- China Southern Airlines

Mexico

- Heliservicio

New Zealand

- Advanced Flight LTD on behalf of Rocket Lab

Norway

- Bristow Norway
- CHC Helikopter Service

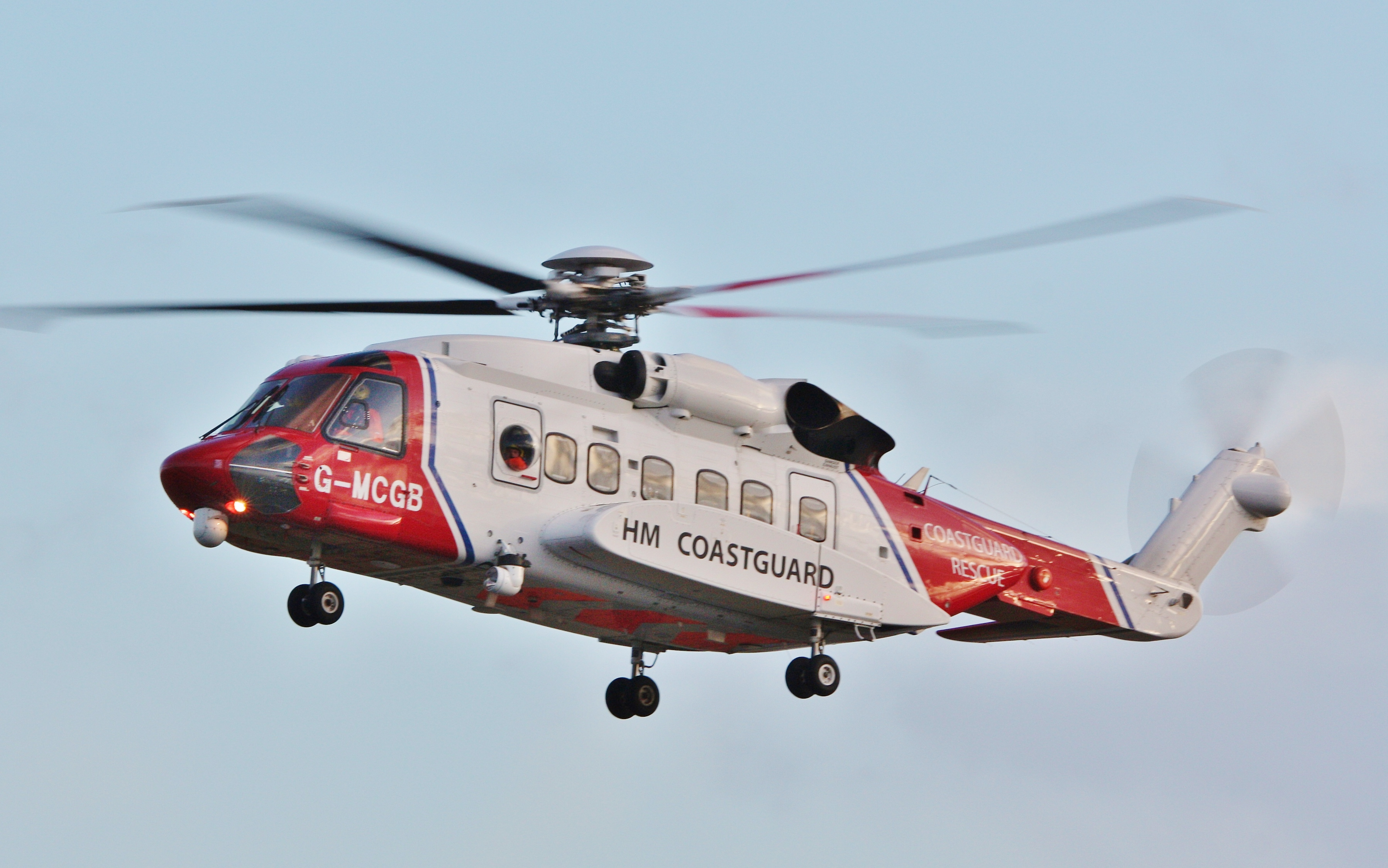
An S-92 of CHC Helicopter operates in the search and rescue role on behalf of His Majesty's Coastguard

Qatar

- Gulf Helicopters

United Kingdom

- Bristow Helicopters
- CHC Helicopter
- Offshore Helicopter Services

United States

- Petroleum Helicopters International

=== Military and government ===
Azerbaijan

- Government of Azerbaijan

Bahrain

- Royal Air Wing

Canada

- Royal Canadian Air Force/Royal Canadian Navy (see Sikorsky CH-148 Cyclone)

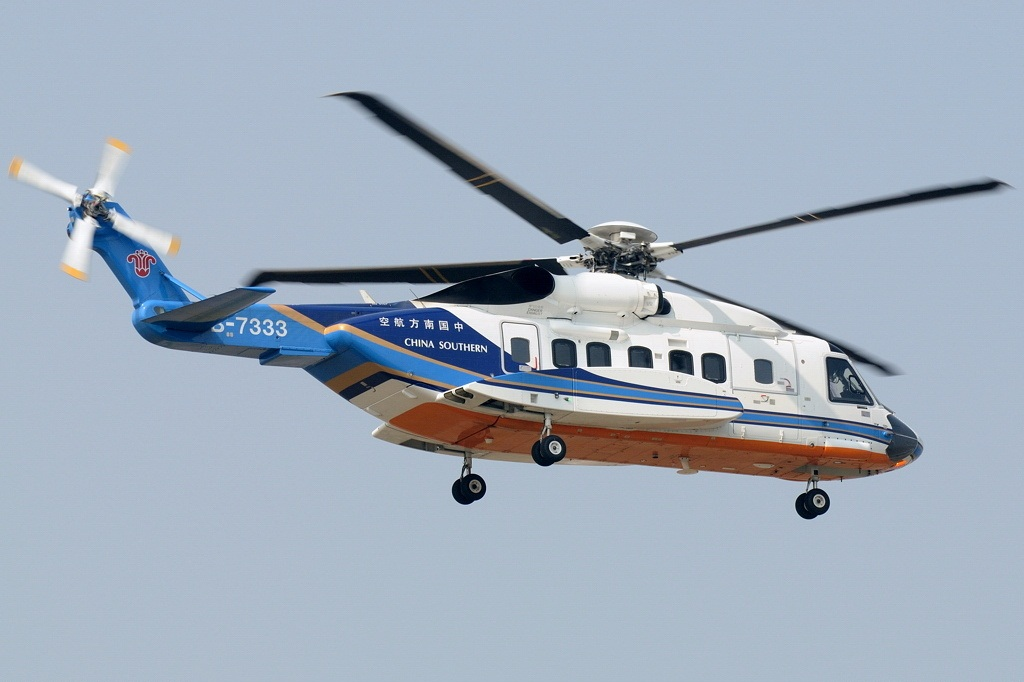
An S-92 from China Southern Airlines

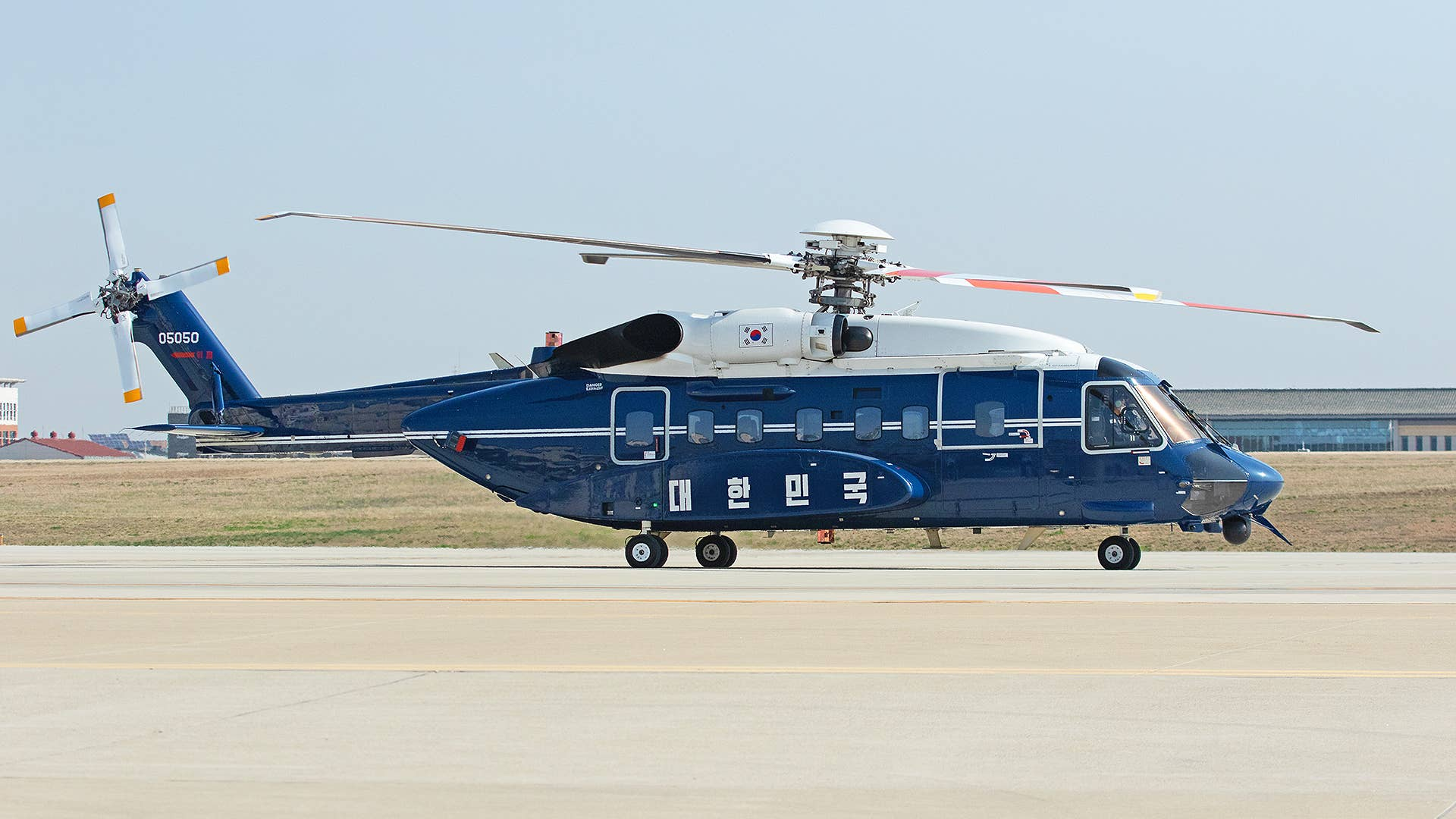
S-92 VVIP used by the South Korean air force for presidential transport duties.

Japan

- Tokyo Metropolitan Police Department

Kuwait

- Kuwait Air Force

Saudi Arabia

- Ministry of Interior

South Korea

- Republic of Korea Air Force, used for transporting the president of South Korea
- Republic of Korea Coast Guard – 2 in use

Thailand

- Royal Thai Air Force – 5 aircraft. Locally designated H.10 (Thai: ฮ.๑๐).

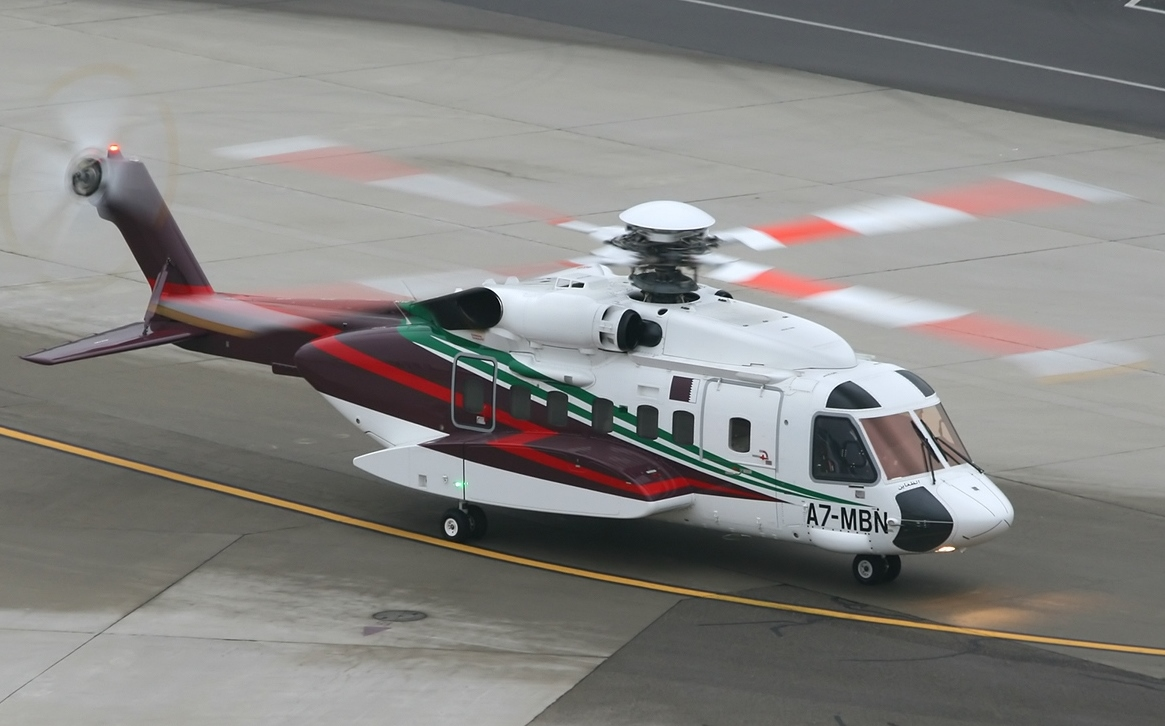
Gulf Helicopters S-92

Turkey

- Government of Turkey

Turkmenistan

- Government of Turkmenistan – 2

United Kingdom

- His Majesty's Coastguard (operated by Bristow Helicopters) – 4
- Babcock Mission Critical Services – 14

United States

- United States Marine Corps (see Sikorsky VH-92)

Uzbekistan

- Uzbekistan Air and Air Defence Forces

== Notable accidents and incidents ==
- On July 2, 2008, an S-92A servicing an oil platform in Australia lost gearbox oil pressure due to fractured oil pump studs and was forced to make an emergency landing. This incident led to Sikorsky issuing a notice to replace titanium gearbox studs with steel studs. This refit had not yet been conducted on the Cougar Helicopters S-92 that crashed the following year.
- On July 19, 2008, an S-92 carrying Rev. Sun Myung Moon crashed in South Korea. The helicopter was flying in inclement weather that forced it down on a hillside. The 16 people aboard were slightly injured in the crash.
- On March 12, 2009, Cougar Helicopters Flight 91, an S-92A operated by Cougar Helicopters carrying 18 passengers and crew en route to oil platforms off the coast of Newfoundland, crashed and sank in 170 meters (560 ft) of water during an attempted ditching. One person was rescued from the North Atlantic with serious injuries and the others did not survive. The crash was determined to be caused by 16 separate factors. The primary cause was galling or fracture of titanium gearbox studs that had not yet been replaced with steel.
- On December 28, 2016, a S-92 (registration G-WNSR, serial number 920250) operated by CHC Helicopter experienced "unexpected control responses" whilst in mid-air on a routine shuttle flight between two oil installations in the North Sea. The pilots conducted an emergency landing on the West Franklin platform. The helicopter is reported to have spun on the helideck during the landing, damaging the helicopter wheels and rotor blades. The helideck also sustained damage during the emergency landing. There were no reported injuries amongst the nine passengers and two crew during the incident. The aircraft was transported back to Aberdeen via ship, at which time the Air Accidents Investigation Branch began their investigation into the incident. Sikorsky issued a notice on January 9, 2017 grounding all S-92 aircraft until the tail rotors have been inspected. The inspection work takes approximately 11 man hours to complete. The Air Accidents Investigation Branch issued an update on January 11, 2017 that reported that the tail rotor pitch change shaft bearing had seized. The bearing showed signs of severe overheating and significant wear. The failure of the bearing allowed the tail rotor driveshaft to damage the tail rotor servo. The damage to the tail rotor servo is considered to be the cause of the loss of tail rotor control. The health and usage monitoring systems had discovered the flaw the day before flight, but the maintenance crew had not.
- On March 14, 2017, a S-92 operated by CHC Helicopter under contract to the Irish Coast Guard crashed off the west coast of Ireland with four crew members on board. Three of the crew were initially missing. Captain Dara Fitzpatrick was recovered from the water but later died in hospital. The helicopter crashed into an unmapped island in poor weather. The helicopter fuselage was located. Captain Mark Duffy's body was recovered in the helicopter's cockpit on March 26.
- On February 28, 2024, a Bristow Group S-92 search and rescue helicopter crashed west of Bergen, Norway with six crew and passengers onboard. One person died in the accident, which was caused by a faulty pitch trim actuator.

== Specifications (S-92) ==
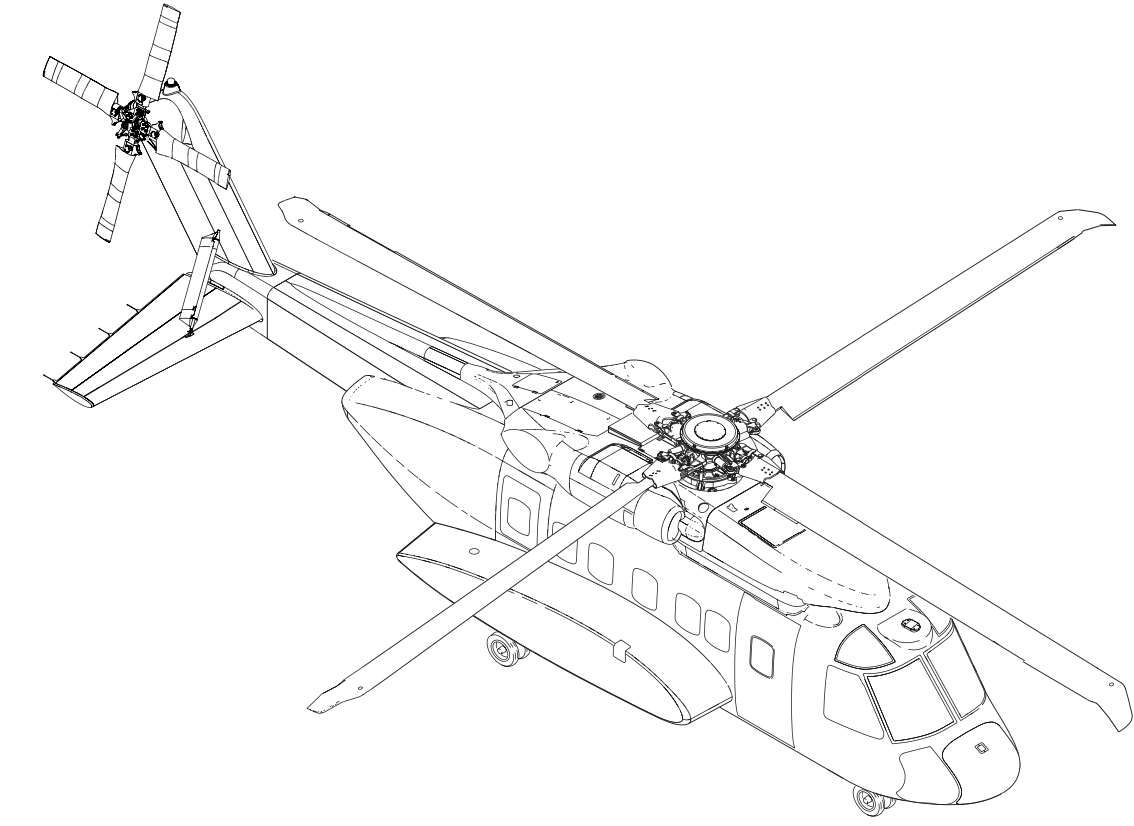
S-92 diagram

Data from Sikorsky S-92 specifications, International Directory of Civil Aircraft

General characteristics

- Crew: 2 (pilot, co-pilot)
- Capacity: 19 passengers
- Length: 68 ft 6 in (20.88 m)
- Width: 17 ft 3 in (5.26 m) fuselage
- Cabin dimensions: 20 ft (6 m) long by 6.6 ft (2 m) tall
- Height: 15 ft 5 in (4.70 m)
- Empty weight: 15,500 lb (7,031 kg)
- Gross weight: 26,500 lb (12,020 kg)
- Max takeoff weight: 27,700 lb (12,565 kg)
- Powerplant: 2 × General Electric CT7-8A turboshaft engines, 2,520 shp (1,880 kW) each
- Main rotor diameter: 56 ft 4 in (17.17 m)
- Main rotor area: 2,492.3 sq ft (231.54 m^{2})
- Blade section: - root: Sikorsky SC2110; tip: Sikorsky SSC-A09

Performance

- Maximum speed: 165 kn (190 mph, 306 km/h)
- Cruise speed: 151 kn (174 mph, 280 km/h)
- Range: 539 nmi (620 mi, 998 km)
- Service ceiling: 14,000 ft (4,300 m)
- Disk loading: 9.8 lb/sq ft (48 kg/m^{2})
- Power/mass: 0.23 hp/lb (0.38 kW/kg)

== See also ==
Related development

- Sikorsky CH-148 Cyclone
- Sikorsky VH-92
- Sikorsky S-70

Aircraft of comparable role, configuration, and era

- AgustaWestland AW189
- AgustaWestland AW101
- Airbus Helicopters H225
- Airbus Helicopters H225M
- Bell 525 Relentless
- Mil Mi-38
- NHIndustries NH90
- Harbin Z-20

Related lists

- List of rotorcraft
