= Dara Fitzpatrick =

Irish helicopter pilot

- Born: 15 October 1971; Kilternan, Dublin, Ireland
- Died: 14 March 2017 (aged 45); Castlebar, County Mayo, Ireland
- Occupations: Irish Coast Guard helicopter search and rescue pilot
- Years active: 1992–2017
- Children: 1

Dara Fitzpatrick (15 October 1971 – 14 March 2017) was the Irish Coast Guard's most senior helicopter search and rescue pilot. As a Captain, she piloted the Dublin-based Rescue 116 helicopter. She was killed in the 2017 Irish Coast Guard Rescue 116 crash in March 2017.

== Background ==
Fitzpatrick had originally wanted to join Aer Lingus, but didn't get accepted. The Irish Air Corps was hiring pilots, so she began taking helicopter lessons. She was one of the first women to pilot an aircraft for the Irish Marine Emergency Service, the precursor to the Coast Guard. She was initially stationed with the Shannon-based search and rescue team, before transferring to Waterford in 2002 where she became chief pilot of the Rescue 117 helicopter, a Sikorsky S-61N. She later joined the Dublin Coast Guard crew and was pilot in charge of Rescue 116, a Sikorsky S-92A.

In 2010, Fitzpatrick and her crew received the "Best of Irish Award" for rescuing an airplane pilot who had crashed into the Irish Sea. In August 2013, Fitzpatrick and her colleague, Captain Carmel Kirby, made Irish aviation history when they crewed the first all-female mission in the Irish Coast Guard helicopter service.

In 2007, she created a video with the Irish Bishops’ Conference, on the theme of "alcohol and the challenge of moderation." She was also known for her starring role in Rescue 117, a 2011 documentary series on RTÉ which gave behind-the-scenes access to the helicopter search and rescue service.

== Death ==
Location of crash site

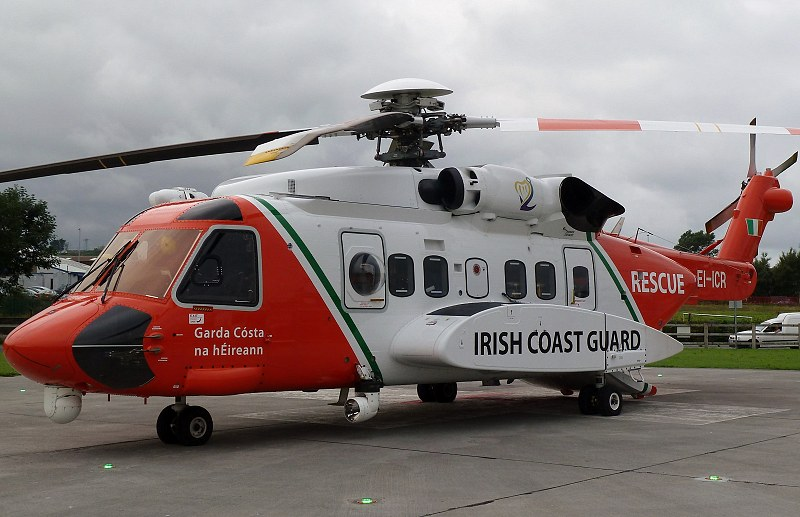
EI-ICR, the aircraft involved in the accident

Fitzpatrick died after her search and rescue team's helicopter, Rescue 116, flew into the side of 280 feet high Black Rock island, in the Atlantic Ocean, in poor weather, while flying along with Sligo-based search and rescue helicopter, Rescue 118, during a rescue mission off the west coast of County Mayo, Ireland. The crew were flying at 200 feet and believed their way was clear of hazards. Fitzpatrick was found and later pronounced dead at Mayo University Hospital in Castlebar. The body belonging to one of the missing crew was found in the cockpit section of the aircraft on 24 March by Navy divers and it was retrieved on 26 March after which it was identified as that of co-pilot Captain Mark Duffy. Two other members of the crew, Winchman Ciarán Smith and Winch Operator Paul Ormsby remained missing and memorial services were held for them in May 2017 and June 2017 respectively. The search and recovery operation was scaled back after April 2017. Her funeral took place on 18 March 2017.

== Legacy ==
The band U2 paid tribute to Dara Fitzpatrick at a concert in July 2017.

Heli Operations, a British helicopter training and crew supply firm named one of their Sea King helicopters 'Dara' after Captain Fitzpatrick.

The circumstances surrounding Dara Fitzpatrick's death was featured in the RTÉ program 2017: A Year in Review.
