= Railway Accident Investigation Unit =

Investigates accidents on Irish railways

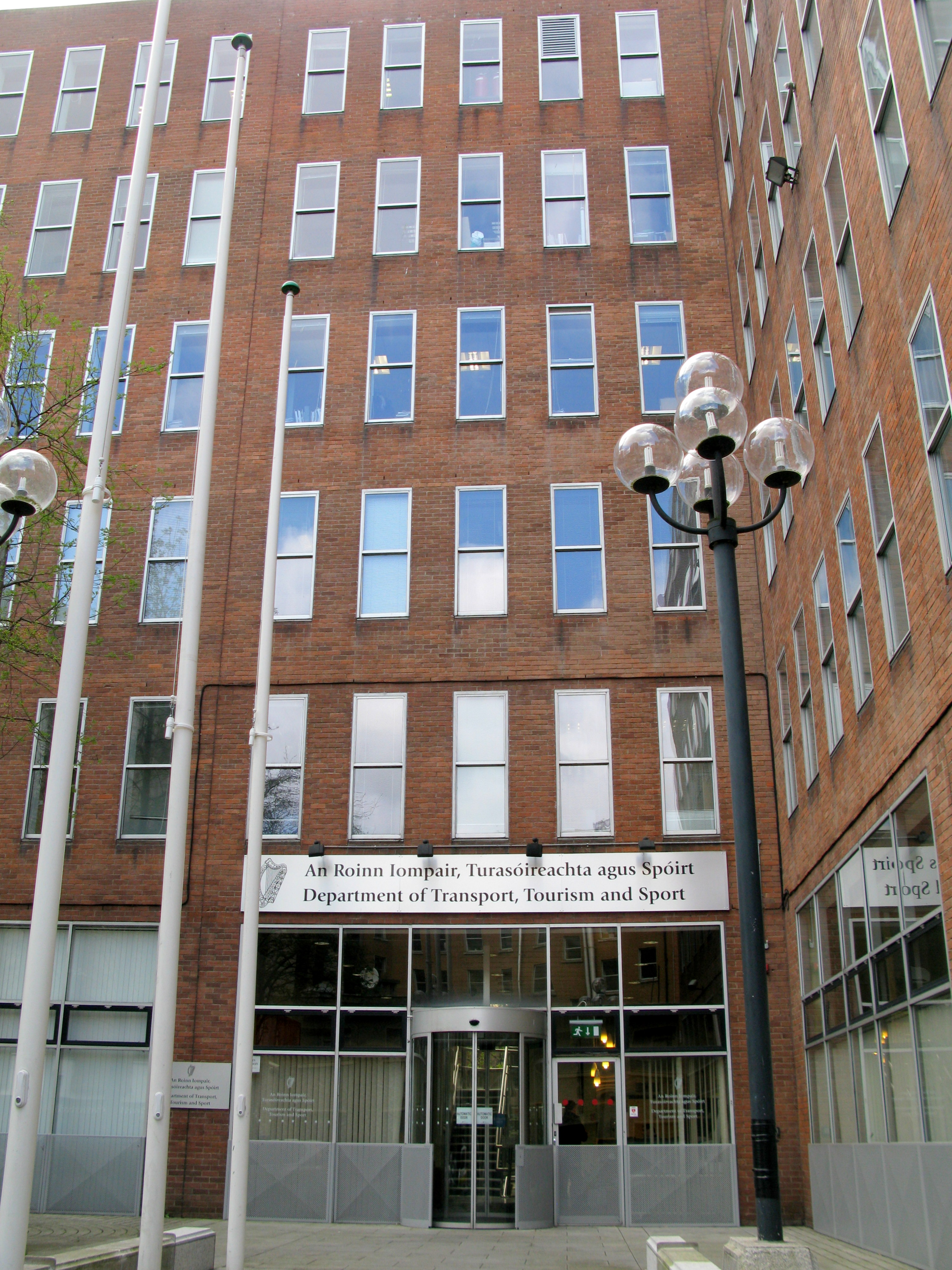
The RAIU is located within the Department of Transport, Tourism and Sport on Leeson Lane, Dublin

The Railway Accident Investigation Unit (RAIU) investigates accidents and incidents on Irish railways. It is an independent investigative agency of the Government of Ireland, housed within the Department of Transport. The RAIU's head office is in Dublin.

The RAIU's investigations are carried out in accordance with the Railway Safety Act 2005, the Railway Safety Directive 2004/49/EC and Statutory Instrument No. 258 of 2014 European Union (Railway Safety) (Reporting and investigation of serious accidents, accidents and incidents) Regulations 2014.

== See also ==
- Air Accident Investigation Unit
- Rail Accident Investigation Branch, the corresponding body for the United Kingdom
