= Eagle Island, County Mayo =

Island in County Mayo, Ireland

Eagle Island
Native name: Oileán sa Tuaidh
- Location within island of Ireland

Geography
- Location: Atlantic Ocean
- Coordinates: 54.282910°N 10.090486°W

Administration
- Ireland
- Province: Connacht
- County: Mayo

Eagle Island (Gaelic: Oileán sa Tuaidh) is a small uninhabited island at the north end of the Mullet Peninsula in Erris off the north west County Mayo Atlantic Ocean coast in Ireland. There is a lighthouse on the island.

Historical population

Year	Pop.	±%
1841	15	—
1851	10	−33.3%
1861	22	+120.0%
1871	17	−22.7%
1881	15	−11.8%
1891	22	+46.7%
1901	3	−86.4%
1911	3	+0.0%

Year	Pop.	±%
1926	0	−100.0%
1936	8	—
1946	3	−62.5%
1951	3	+0.0%
1956	4	+33.3%
1961	3	−25.0%
1966	4	+33.3%
1971	3	−25.0%

Year	Pop.	±%
1979	3	+0.0%
1981	3	+0.0%
1986	3	+0.0%
1991	0	−100.0%
1996	0	0.00%
2002	0	0.00%
2006	0	0.00%

Source: Central Statistics Office. "CNA17: Population by Off Shore Island, Sex and Year". irishislands.info.
