= Nordic Standard Helicopter Program =

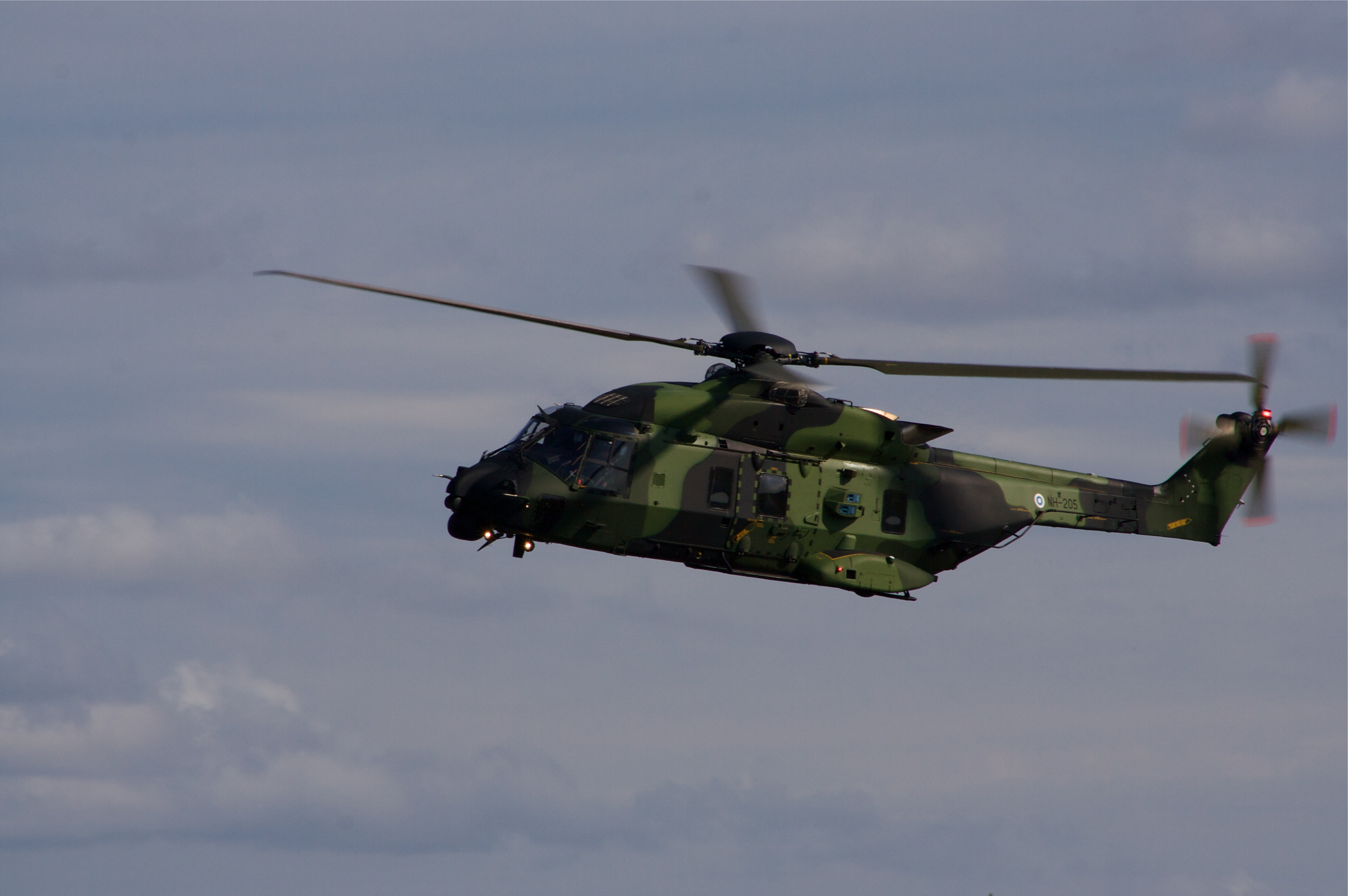
Finnish NH90

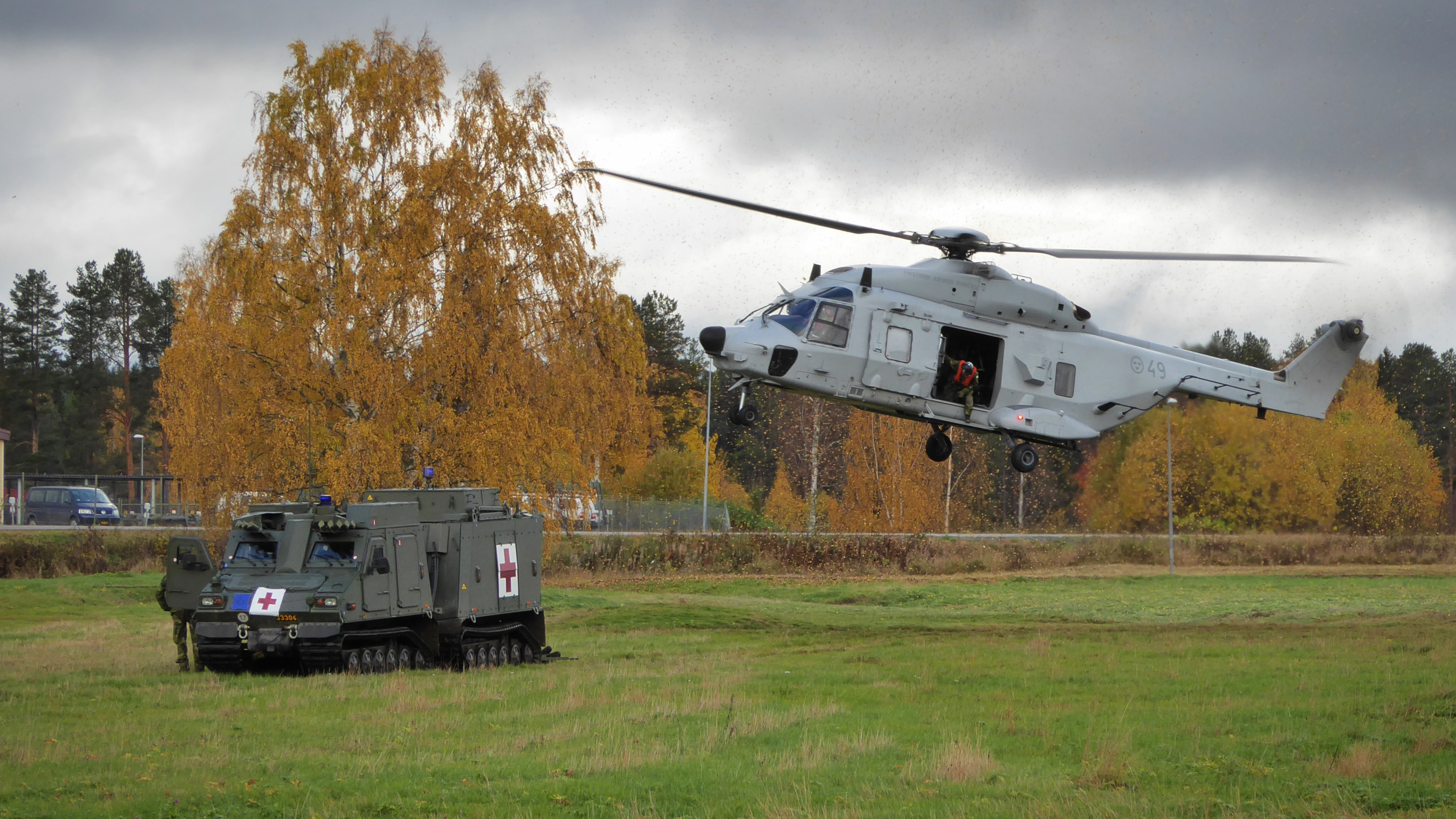
Swedish NH90

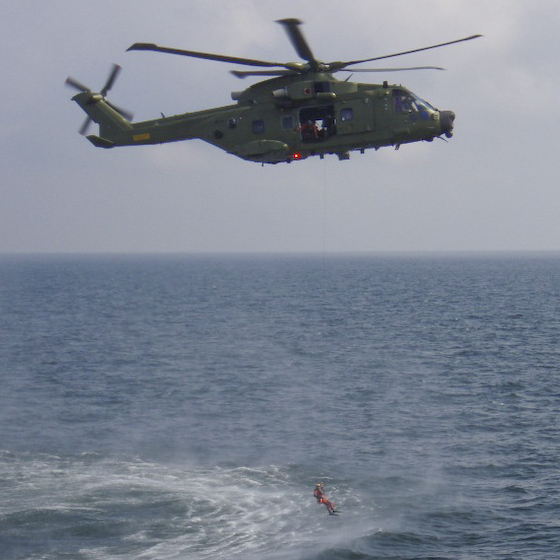
Danish AW101

Nordic Standard Helicopter Program (NSHP) was an international helicopter procurement program in the late 1990s and early 2000s to choose a standard helicopter for Norway, Sweden, Finland, and initially Denmark. In 1999, the four countries issued a requirement for a helicopter in the 9-15 ton range, which lead to the NH90 being selected in 2001.

Denmark dropped out and chose the EH101, leaving Norway, Sweden, and Finland buying the NHI NH90 helicopter in September 2001. The helicopter was still in development and orders began in the late 2000s and early 2010s to the countries. In 2022 Norway terminated the order because NHI took to long to deliver working helicopters, leaving Sweden and Finland.

Finland has 20 in service for Army transport, and Sweden has 18 with some for transport and some for SAR;Sweden uses the HCV high cabin variant.

== Background & Selection ==
Norway took initiative in 1998 to establish the Nordic Standard Helicopter Program (NSHP), which would see a common unified model for the three Nordic countries. Four helicopters were considered: the AgustaWestland AW101, the NHIndustries NH90, the Eurocopter AS532 Cougar and the Sikorsky S-92.

In 1999, Norway, Denmark, Sweden, and Finland issued the specs for potential joint helicopter purchase, that would be in the 9-15 ton range and possibly license built.

The NHindustries NH90 was chosen in September 2001 as the Nordic Standard Helicopter winner, with orders for 18 from Sweden, 14 for Norway, and 20 for Finland. At the same time, Denmark dropped out of NHSP and chose the EH101, but Norway, Sweden, and Finland placed orders for the still in development, NH90, in various versions.

In September 2001 Norwegian Armed Forces chose to purchase fourteen NH90 units. The plan was for eight of the Norwegian helicopters would go to the Coast Guard and the rest will serve on the frigates. Sweden and Finland also placed orders, and airframes for all three would be assembled mostly in Patria, Finland. (As mentioned elsewhere, the Norwegian functional airframes took so long to deliver, they cancelled the order over two decades later)

The NH90 for the NHSP order were assembled in Patria, Finland; one of the five final assembly locations for the NH90 including France, Germany, Italy, and Australia. The helicopters for Finland, Norway, and Sweden were mostly assembled at Patria, Finland.

== Aftermath ==
The choice was met with resistance from the SAR community which felt the NH90 was too small, and this one reason Denmark had pulled out and chose the EH101. Years of lawsuits led to demands for more open competition for the a SAR helicopter which lead to Norway's NAWSARH procurement program with Iceland in the 2010s. In September 2001, Denmark did not choose the NH90 which reduced the NHSP countries from four to three, and the Danish ended up choosing EH101 to replace their aging Sikorsky S-61 fleet. Norway ended up running the NAWSARH with Iceland (though Iceland pulled out in 2012) to select a SAR helicopter in a separate competition, ultimately choosing the AW101 also. In 2022, after over two decades after its order, and waiting many years waiting for aircraft and other issues, Norway cancelled its 14 airframe NH90 order.

Denmark dropped out of NHSP in September 2001 and instead chose the EH101, but Norway, Sweden, and Finland placed orders for the still in development, NH90, in various versions.

== See also ==
- Viking-class submarine (attempt at a joint Nordic submarine)
- AMOS
