= Irish Coast Guard =

Government role in Ireland

- Garda Cósta na hÉireann
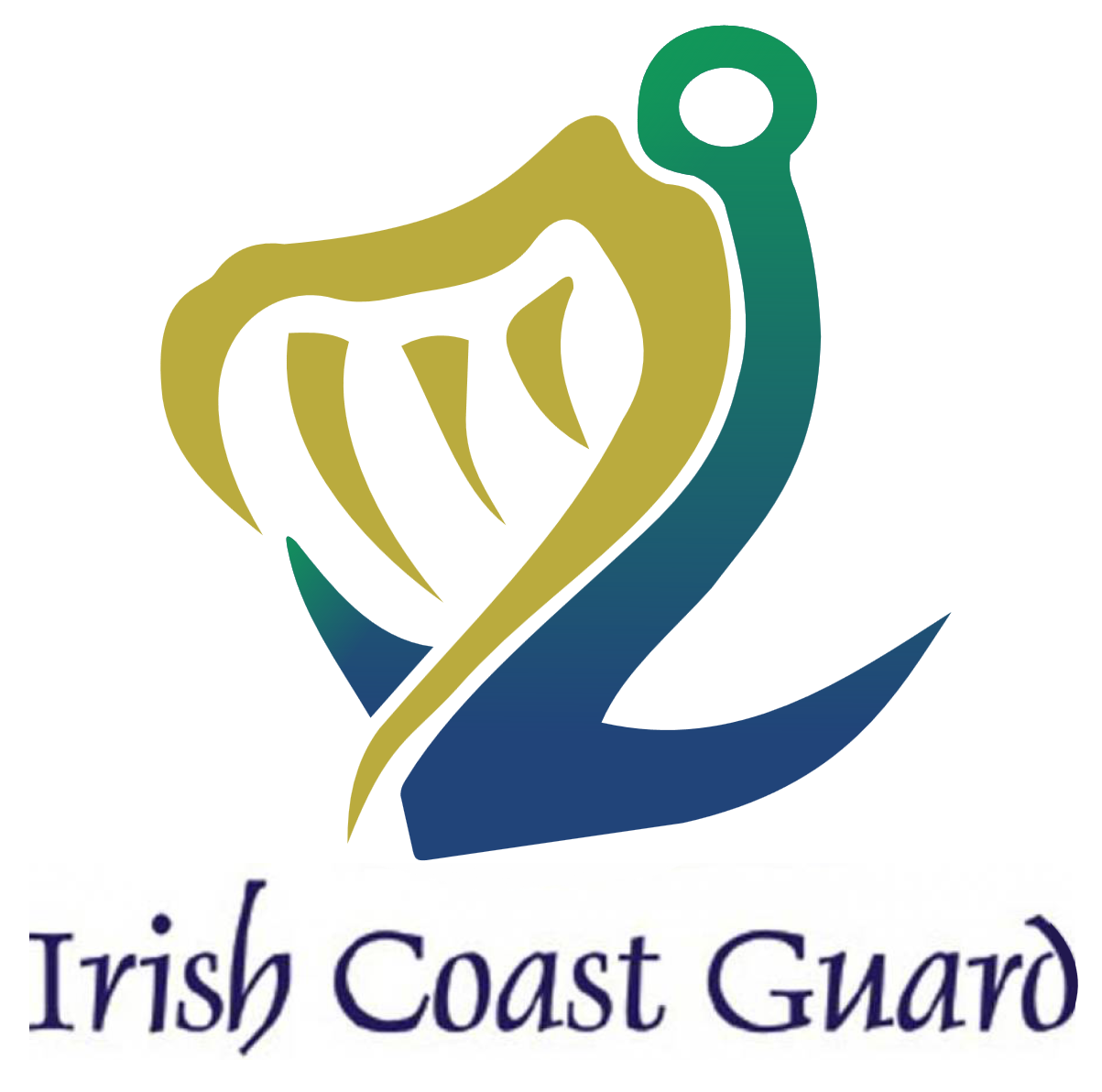
- Irish Coast Guard emblem

Agency overview
- Formed: 1822
- Jurisdiction: Ireland
- Headquarters: Leeson Lane, Dublin 2
- Minister responsible: Darragh O'Brien, Minister for Transport
- Agency executive: Micheál O'Toole, Director
- Website: www.gov.ie

The Irish Coast Guard (IRCG; Irish: Garda Cósta na hÉireann [ˈɡaːɾˠd̪ˠə ˈkoːsˠt̪ˠə n̪ˠə ˈheːɾʲən̪ˠ]) is part of the Department of Transport in Ireland. The primary roles of the Coast Guard include maritime safety and search and rescue. The Irish Marine Search and Rescue Region (IMSRR) is the area over which the Coast Guard has responsibility. This area is bordered by the UK Search and Rescue Region.

== History ==
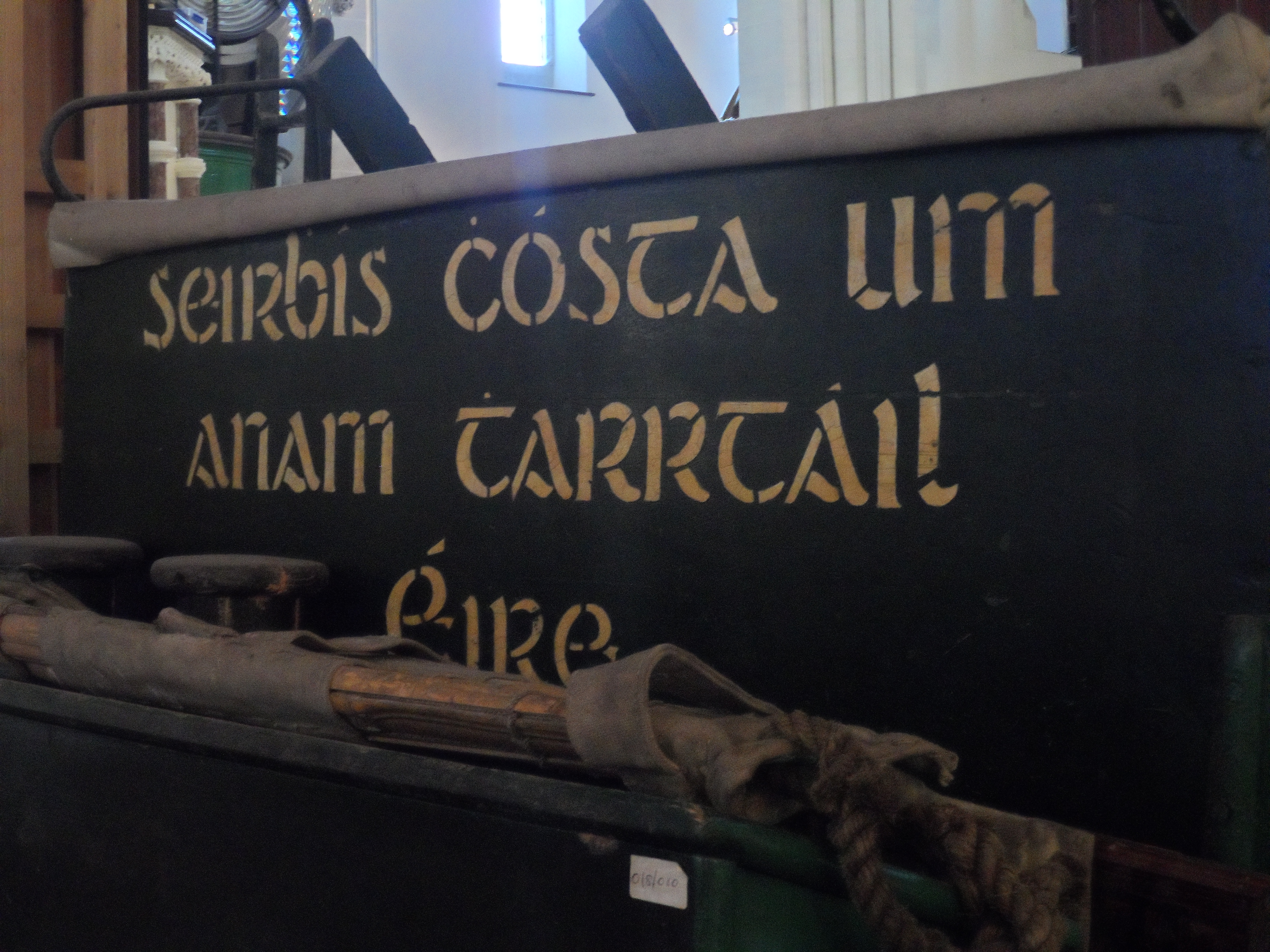
Seirbhís Chósta um Anam Tharrtáil, Éire (literally "Coast Soul-Saving Service, Ireland") — sign in the National Maritime Museum of Ireland

The British Water Guard (formed 1809) and (Preventive) Coast Guard (formed 1822) extended to Ireland as part of the United Kingdom of Great Britain and Ireland. During this period the Coast Guard played revenue protection and coastal defence roles, as well as forming part of the Royal Naval Reserve. In the 1850s, the Admiralty took over the Coast Guard; officers stationed in Ireland complained that their naval career was retarded relative to those in England.

The Irish Free State was formed in December 1922, and Tom Casement (brother of Roger Casement) tried unsuccessfully to establish a new Irish coast guard. In late 1923 Casement instead became first Inspector of a new Coast Life Saving Service (CLSS). In 1927, before the Irish Naval Service had been formed, the Admiralty discussed the possibility of CLSS participation in minesweeping of the Treaty Ports. During the Emergency declared in the Second World War, the Department of Defence established a separate Coast Watch after the use of the CLSS to keep watch for belligerent ships and aircraft was vetoed by the Department of Industry and Commerce, which ran the CLSS.

The CLSS was later renamed the Coast and Cliff Rescue Service (CCRS). In 1979 there were 54 stations, 51 equipped with breeches buoys and three only with ladders for cliff rescue. A 1990 inquiry into air sea rescue chaired by retired Garda Commissioner Eamonn Doherty recommended transferring responsibility from the Irish Air Corps to a new emergency service. The then government accepted the recommendation in August 1990, and the service was established in the then Department of the Marine by minister Michael Woods in May 1991 under the name "Slánú — The Irish Marine Emergency Service" (IMES), and subsumed the CCRS. In February 2000 the name was changed to the Irish Coast Guard following the wishes of many of its personnel. The spelling "Coast Guard" (as opposed to "Coastguard") is intended to hark back to its nineteenth-century origins; His Majesty's Coastguard (HMCG) adopted the single-word spelling in 1925, after the Free State had separated from the United Kingdom.

In 2012, Fisher Associates conducted a value-for-money review of the Coast Guard and recommended closing the stations at Valentia and Malin Head. The Fisher report was criticised by Coast Guard management and reviewed by an Oireachtas committee, prompting a revised report in 2013.

== Operations ==
=== Role and status ===
The Coast Guard operates as a division of the Department of Transport under the Irish Maritime Administration (IMA). Other sections of the IMA include the Marine Survey Office and Maritime Services Division.

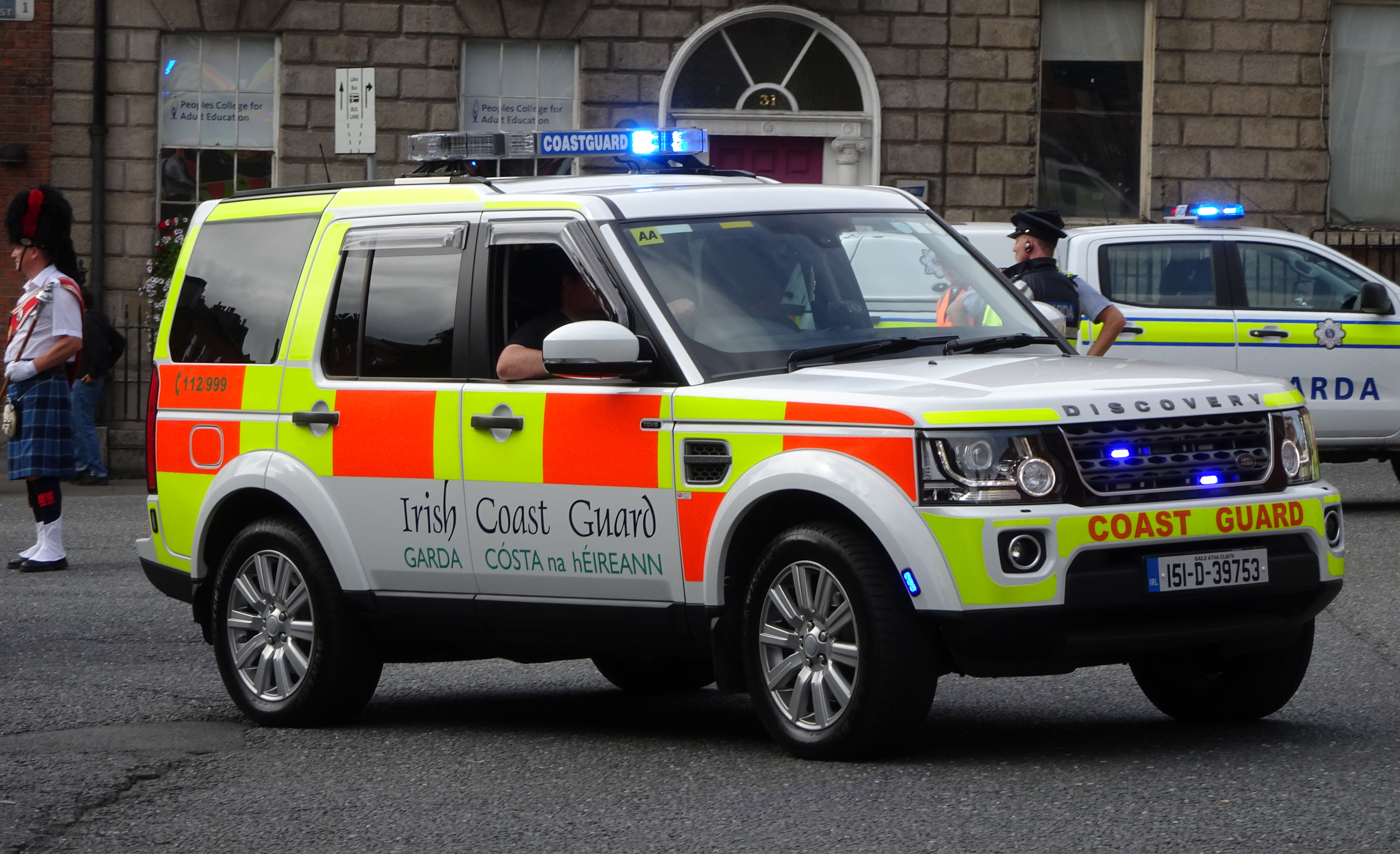
A IRCG Land Rover on display during National Services Day

The Coast Guard is responsible for:

- Search and rescue
- Marine communications network
- Marine safety awareness
- Pollution and salvage response in the marine environment (the Marine Rescue Co-ordination Centre (MRCC) in Dublin coordinates all pollution & salvage control in the Irish Exclusive Economic Zone (EEZ)).

Unlike coastguard models in some other countries, in Ireland, it is not part of the Irish Defence Forces. It does however call on their assistance through the use of its Air Corps and Naval assets. Also, while in some jurisdictions fisheries patrols are the responsibility of the Coast Guard, in Ireland, these are carried out by the Irish Air Corps and Irish Naval Service and drug smuggling patrols by the Irish Air Corps, Customs, Gardaí and the Naval Service. (However, all the above government services can at any time request assistance from each other when needed).

=== Members ===
The Irish Coast Guard is a civilian agency, members are not part of the Defence Forces and thus are forbidden from carrying any type of weapons and have no security or defence duties in respect of national police or defence.

Coast Guard personnel include full-time paid employees, and unpaid volunteers. For example, a member of the Coast Guard, Caitriona Lucas, who died while on a rescue/recovery mission in County Clare in 2016, was a volunteer.

Not all Irish Coast Guard members have enforcement powers – only some officers under warrant.

=== Stations ===
The IRCG has 44 operating bases or units across Ireland. Its administrative offices are at Leeson Lane in Dublin.

== Equipment ==
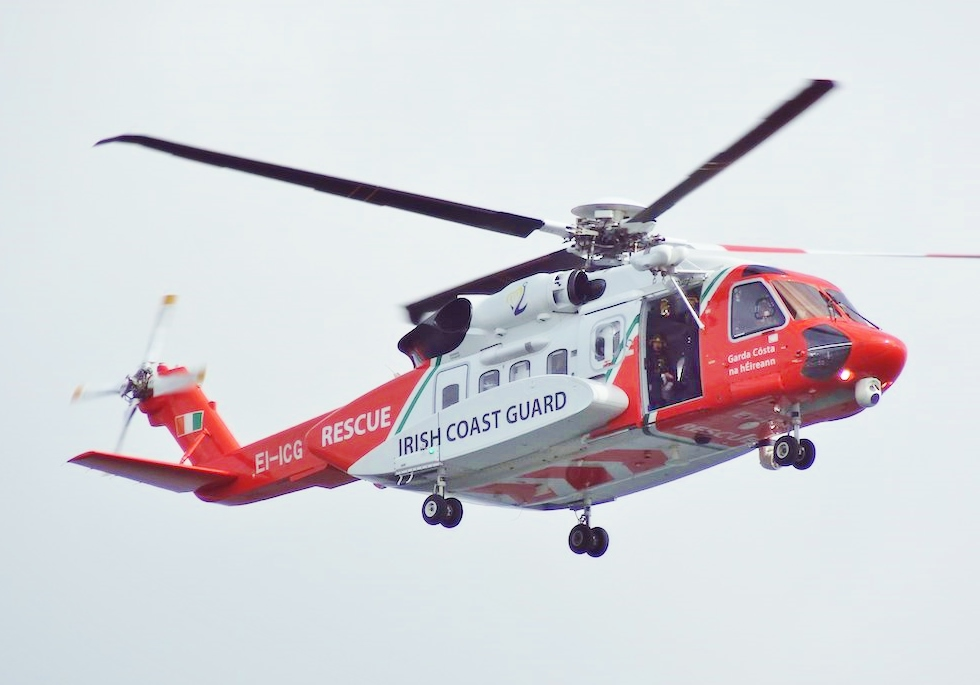
A Sikorsky S-92 from CHC Helicopter

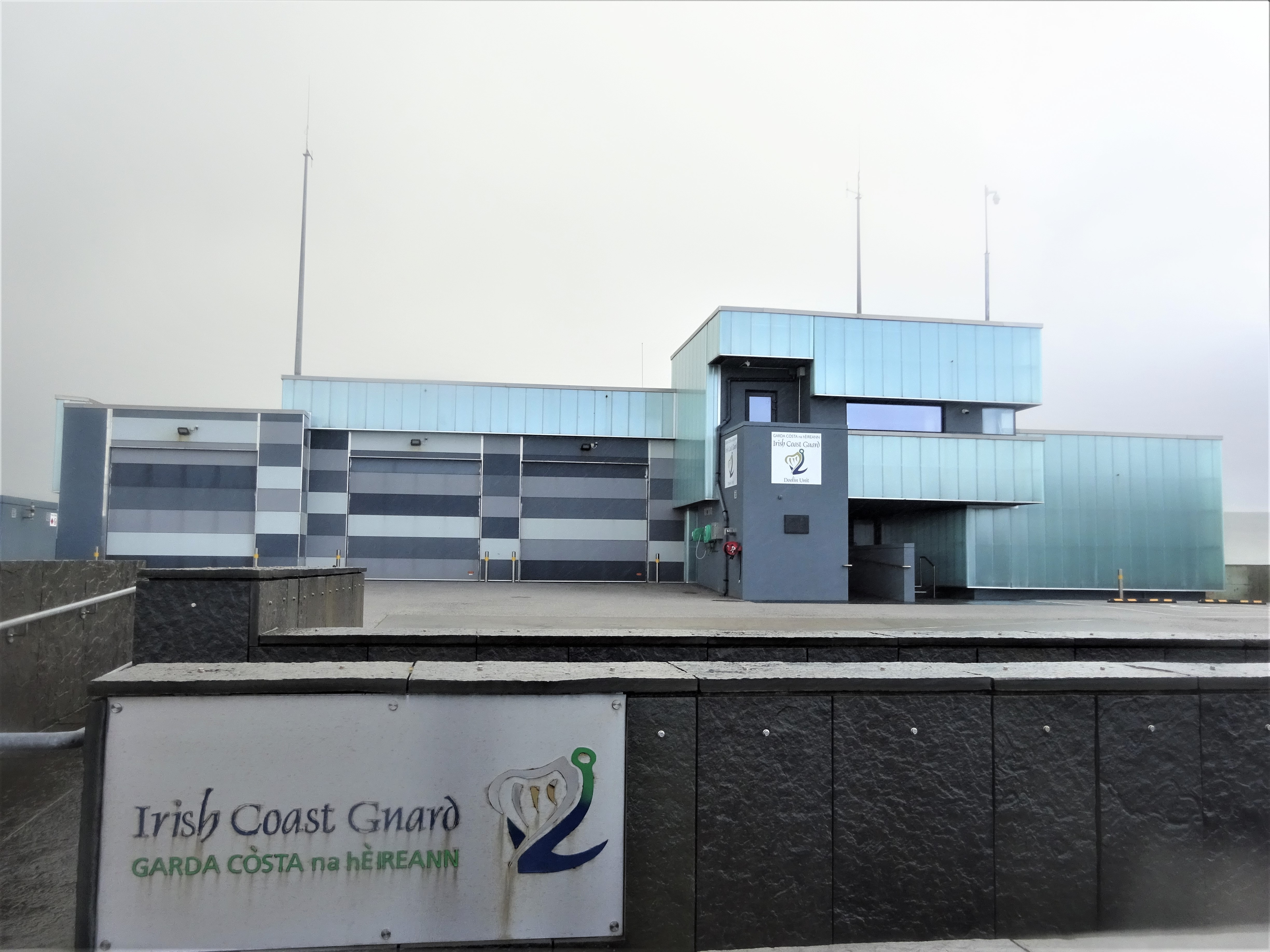
Irish Coast Guard station, Doolin

The IRCG operate rescue boats, rigid inflatable boats and other search and rescue vehicles and equipment from coastal stations around Ireland.

The IRCG also has a contract with a private company for Sikorsky Search and Rescue helicopters operating from Dublin, Waterford, Shannon and Sligo bases. These helicopters are contracted from CHC Helicopter—a controversial contract and costs the state €50 million per year. A similar SAR contract involving CHC was cancelled in the UK in 2012 as a result of alleged 'irregularities'. Under the €500 million contract, from 2010, a previous fleet of Sikorsky S-61N helicopters were replaced with five newer Sikorsky S-92 helicopters. One of the new S-92 helicopters is located at each of the four IRCG bases, with one additional aircraft being rotated between bases.

The first operational S-92 helicopter arrived in Ireland in January 2012 and given the registration EI-ICG. After a period of training and pilot conversion (from the S-61N type), this helicopter was given call-sign "RESCUE115" and replaced the S-61N that was previously based at Shannon. The five S-92's were given the registrations EI-ICG, EI-ICU, EI-ICA, EI-ICR, EI-ICD – with the last letter of each registration spelling out "GUARD".

As of late 2016, the S-92s were deployed as: Callsign Rescue 118 operating from Sligo, Rescue 117 operating from Waterford, Rescue 115 operating from Shannon, and Rescue 116 operating from Dublin. While EI-ICG was delivered as "factory new" from Sikorsky in the US, the other S-92 aircraft were ex-UK Coastguard equipment. Following the 2017 crash of EI-ICR (Rescue 116), a newer S-92 replacement was sourced by CHC from Australia, and registered as EI-ICS.

In mid-2020, the Irish Coast Guard launched a tender for a future SAR aviation contract, to supersede the (2010) CHC agreement. In May 2023 Bristow Ireland was announced as the preferred bidder in a ten-year contract worth €670 million. The contract provides for six AW189 helicopters operating from Dublin, Shannon, Sligo and Waterford, and two Super King Air aircraft operating from Shannon Airport. Bristow is due to begin transitioning to the new contract from late 2024.

The Bristow-backed Coast Guard air service, which was launched in August 2025, operates 6 AW189 helicopters and 2 Beechcraft B200 King Air airplanes. The AW189s operate from Waterford, Sligo, Dublin and Shannon; the King Airs are also based at Shannon. The airplanes provide a 24-hour fixed wing aircraft service to the Coast Guard, the first time the Coast Guard has such capability. The planes provide patrol, surveillance and environmental monitoring capability. The service changeover was still ongoing at the time of the launch, with full transfer expected to complete by early 2026. As part of the transfer, Coast Guard aircraft are due to switch their operations from Dublin Airport, after operating from there for 27 years, to Weston Airport.

== Incidents ==
- In July 1999, an Air Corps helicopter crashed: The four crew members of a Dauphin helicopter, on SAR duties, died shortly after midnight on 2 July 1999, when their helicopter hit a sand dune in thick fog at Tramore Beach, County Waterford, while returning from a successful rescue mission.
- In September 2016, a Coast Guard volunteer, Caitriona Lucas, died while on a rescue/recovery mission in County Clare. In November 2023, the inquest jury returned a verdict of misadventure, and recommended improvements to safety management.
- In March 2017, RESCUE 116 crashed providing cover for another Coast Guard helicopter off the coast of County Mayo. Captain Dara Fitzpatrick was recovered from the water at around 7 am on 14 March in a critical condition, and transferred to Mayo University Hospital where she was pronounced dead. Captain Mark Duffy was recovered from the wreckage on the 26 March. Winch crew Paul Ormsby and Ciarán Smith remain missing.

== See also ==
- Commissioners of Irish Lights
- Royal National Lifeboat Institution
- Independent lifeboats in Britain and Ireland
- His Majesty's Coastguard
- Isle of Man Coastguard
