= Air Accident Investigation Unit =

- An tAonad um Imscrúdú Aerthionóiscí
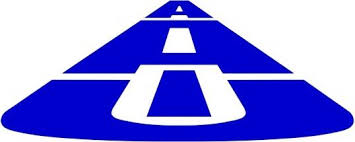
- AAIU logo

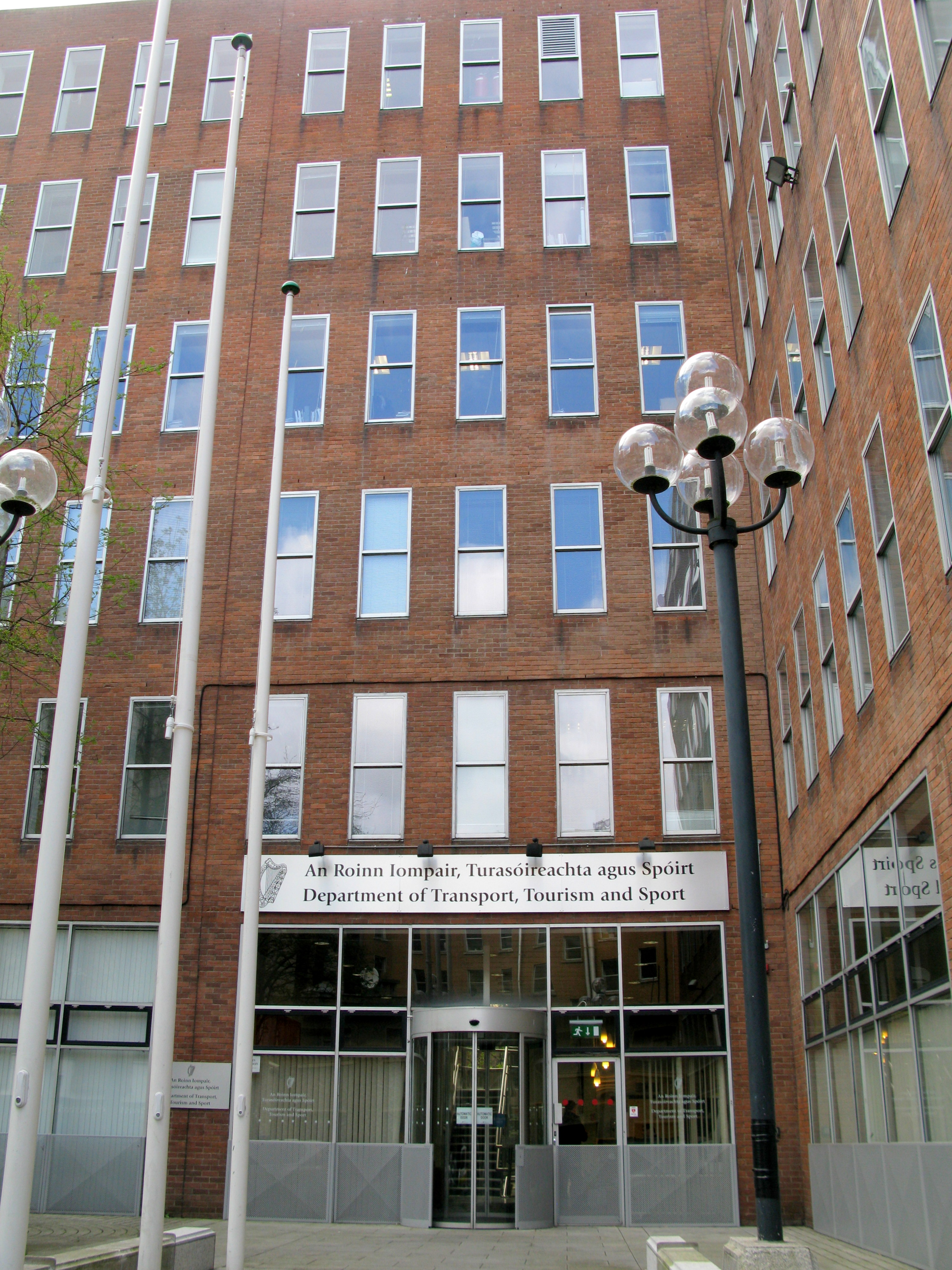
- Department of Transport - The AAIU HQ

Agency overview
- Formed: 1994; 32 years ago
- Jurisdiction: Government of Ireland
- Headquarters: Leeson Lane, Dublin
- Employees: 10: 1 Chief Inspector of Air Accidents (Pilot); 3 Administrative and Support; 8 Inspectors of Air Accidents of which 4 are Engineers and 4 are Pilots
- Parent department: Department of Transport
- Website: www.aaiu.ie

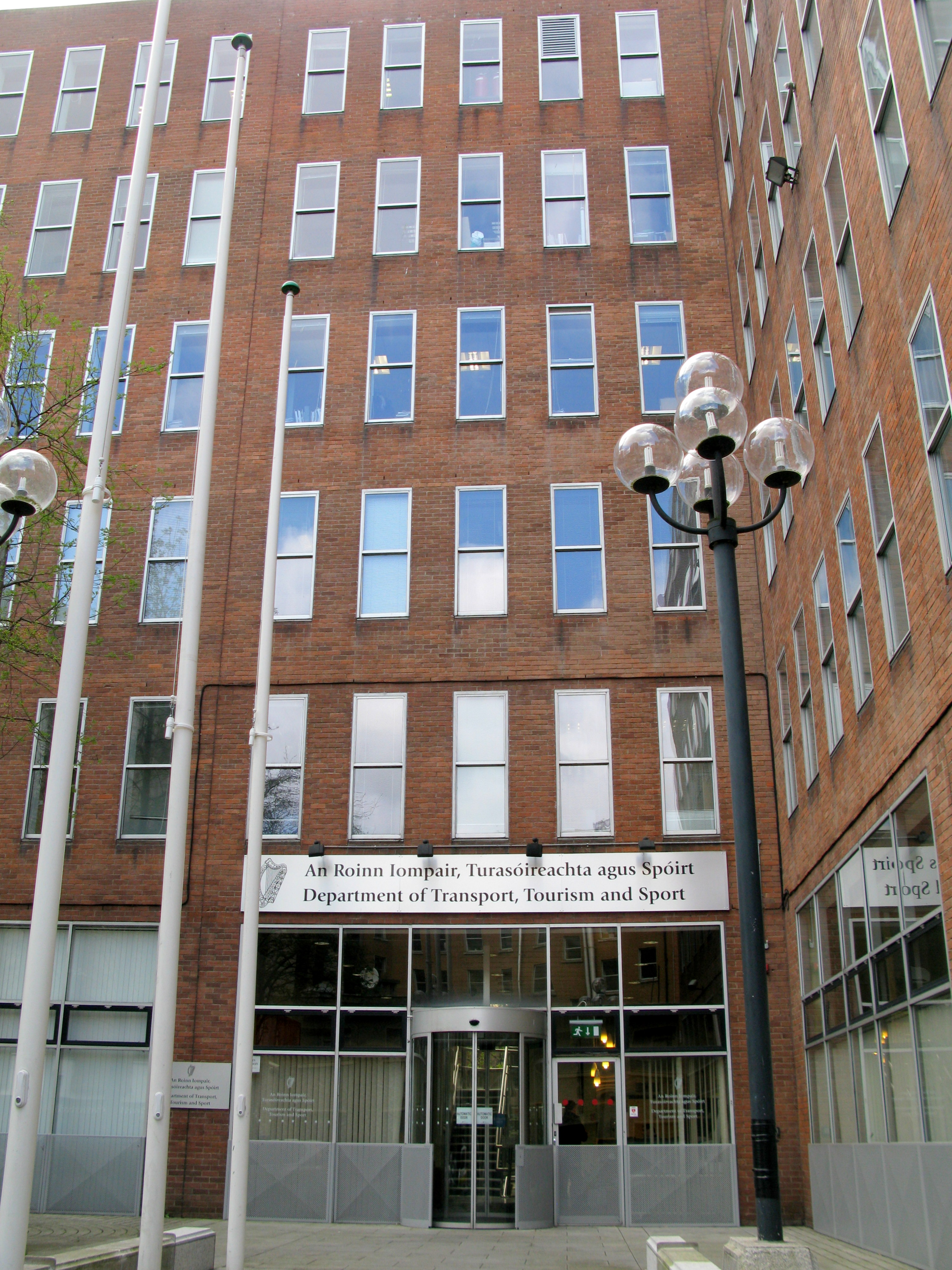
Head office of the AAIU

The Air Accident Investigation Unit (AAIU) (Irish: An tAonad um Imscrúdú Aerthionóiscí) is part of the Department of Transport of Ireland, and is responsible for the investigation of aircraft accidents and serious incidents within Ireland, and Irish-registered aircraft outside the jurisdiction.

The unit's head offices are at the Department of Transport buildings on Leeson Lane in Dublin. It was previously located at Transport House in Dublin.

== History ==
Air Accident Investigation in Ireland dates back to the early thirties and was historically performed by the aeronautical staff of what is now the Department of Transport. At various stages in the past, this department was known as the Department of Industry and Commerce, Department of Transport and Power, Department of Industry and Energy, Department of Energy, the Department of Transport, Energy and Communications, Department of Public Enterprise and the Department of Transport.

=== Irish Aviation Authority ===
In December 1993, the Irish Aviation Authority (IAA) was set up, as a self-funding semi-state organisation, to regulate civil aviation in Ireland. At the same time air accident investigation remained within the remit of the then department. Investigations were conducted under the Statutory Instrument No. 19 of 1957 Air Navigation (Investigation of Accidents) Regulation, 1957. However, European Union Council Directive 94/56/EC, which established the fundamental principles governing the investigation of civil aviation accidents and incidents of 21 November 1994, (effective 21 November 1996) required under Article 6 that:

"Each Member State shall ensure that technical investigations are conducted or supervised by a permanent civil aviation body or entity. The body or entity concerned shall be functionally independent in particular of the national aviation authorities responsible for airworthiness, certification, flight operation, maintenance, licensing, air traffic control or airport operation and, in general, of any other party whose interests could conflict with the task entrusted to the investigation body of entity"

=== Formation of AAIU ===
As such an independent air accident investigation body, known as the Air Accident Investigation Unit (AAIU) was formed in 1994 within the then Department of Transport, Energy and Communications and legislation was prepared to take account of the provisions of Annex 13 and the obligations of the European Union Council Directive 94/56/EC. On the 25 July 1997, Statutory Instrument No. 205 of 1997 Air Navigation (Notification and Investigation of Accidents and Incidents) Regulations, 1997 came into effect and investigations were conducted under this legislation until 9 December 2009.

To reflect amendments to Annex 13 (Tenth Edition) a new Statutory Instrument No. 460 of 2009, Air Navigation (Notification and Investigation of Accidents, Serious Incidents and Incidents) Regulations, 2009, was developed and came into effect on 9 December 2009. This replaces the earlier Statutory Instrument No. 205 of 1997. Investigations initiated prior to the 9 December 2009 are subject to the provisions of Statutory Instrument No. 205 of 1997.

Investigations undertaken after 9 December 2009 are subject to the provisions of Statutory Instrument No. 460 of 2009.

In taking account of lessons learn from the implementation of Council Directive 94/56/EC, the establishment of the European Aviation Safety Agency (EASA), amendments to Annex 13 and in order to improve the efficiency of the investigation and prevention of civil aviation accidents and incidents in the Union, a new Regulation (EU) No. 996/2010 of the European Parliament and of the Council of 20 October 2010 on the investigation and prevention of accidents and incidents in civil aviation was developed and entered into force December 2010.

== Response to Notification of Occurrence ==
A core element of the AAIU response to notification of an occurrence is the 24 hour/365 day Inspector-on-Call (IOC) duty roster. During normal working hours the Administration staff will refer all notifications to the IOC. Outside of normal duty hours, the duty IOC will receive notifications directly to the IOC mobile.

The obligation to investigate is based around specific definitions for accidents, serious incidents and incidents.

The AAIU's response will be commensurate with the severity of the event, whether it is a commercial public transport, commercial cargo, general aviation or sport flight and whether significant safety lessons can be drawn from the investigation.

In general, the following options will be considered:

- To investigate the accident by deploying a significant sized “Go Team” that may include foreign Accredited Representatives (ACCREP), Advisors, and Observers from foreign States (Public Transport accident and/or where significant fatalities/serious injuries have taken place).
- To investigate the accident/serious incident by deploying a small “Go Team” to conduct a field investigation (normally for general aviation or sport flying type occurrences and some serious incidents to public transport aircraft).
- To investigate a minor occurrence through correspondence using the AAIU Accident/Incident Report Form.
- Where, following initial assessment, it is deemed that the occurrence is a non-reportable event or that no significant safety lessons can be learnt, discontinue the investigation but record the data in ECCAIRS.
- To delegate the Investigation to an approved authority or organization (National or International).
- To appoint an Accredited Representative (ACCREP) (Travelling and Non-Travelling) and/or experts for overseas investigations of accidents to Irish registered and/or operated aircraft.
- To appoint an Inspector of Air Accidents to provide assistance or advice where a State (military) aircraft is involved and the occurrence is not the subject of an AAIU Investigation.

=== Deployment Priorities ===
The AAIU has limited investigative resources to meet the on-going demand to investigate all accidents, serious incidents and incidents reported through the Mandatory Occurrence Reports (MOR's) Safety Occurrence Tracking System (SOTS).

The following order of priority for the deployment of staff resources will be adopted:

- Passenger carrying public transport aircraft (fixed or rotary wing) with loss of life or serious injury.
- Non-passenger carrying public transport aircraft with loss of life.
- Significant non-fatal accidents (serious incidents) to public transport aircraft.
- Fatal and significant non-fatal accidents to other aircraft.
- Serious incidents, including any AIRPROX (likely to be Category A).
- Where a significant safety lesson can be learnt.

== Activities at an Accident Site ==
Following an aviation accident and mindful of the priority for the preservation of life by the Emergency Services, the Garda Síochána will secure and preserve the immediate area of the accident site, pending the arrival of the AAIU “Go-Team”. Every effort will be made to arrive on-site as soon as possible. As such the AAIU may utilize military helicopter transport (if available) with follow-up support travelling by road.

On arrival, a briefing will take place between the Senior Garda Officer and the Senior AAIU Investigator, in order to determine the initial facts known at that time and develop an agreed course of action on how to progress the on-site activities. Where it has been determined that an unlawful criminal act has taken place, the Garda Síochána will have primacy on site and the AAIU will provide technical support on request.

Where no unlawful criminal act has taken place, the AAIU will commence a field investigation. An AAIU Investigator-in-Charge (IIC) will be appointed at the accident site and he/she will be responsible for managing all aspects of the investigation, both on-scene and for the entire course of that particular investigation. In general, the main activities on-site would include:

- Gathering perishable evidence
- Recovery of recorders (where available)
- Recording entire wreckage and wreckage field
- Identifying primary parts of aircraft
- Gathering associated evidence (ATC, Aircraft and Personnel records, etc.)
- Conducting witness interviews
- Recovery of wreckage to AAIU examination facility in Gormanston, Co. Meath.

=== The Investigation ===
The depth of investigation will be determined by the severity/size of the event, while taking account of whether significant safety lessons can be drawn to enhance aviation safety, in particular, in the area of public transport.

In general terms and not exhaustive, the following areas will be considered in the investigation:

OPERATIONS: The history of the flight and personnel information

STRUCTURES: Documentation of the airframe wreckage and the accident site, including calculation of impact angles to determine the accident sequence

POWERPLANTS: Examination of engines (and propellers) and engine accessories

SYSTEMS: Study of components of the aircraft's hydraulic, electrical, pneumatic and associated systems, including instruments and the flight control system

AIR TRAFFIC CONTROL: Reconstruction of air traffic services, including acquisition of ATC radar data and transcripts of ATC communications

WEATHER: Gathering weather data associated with the operation of the flight

RECORDERS: Recovery, download and analysis of cockpit and flight recorders (when available) and any other device that may contain non-volatile memory

HUMAN PERFORMANCE: Study of crew performance, including training, workload, work environment, equipment/cockpit design, fatigue, medication, alcohol, drugs, medication, medical and licencing history

SURVIVAL FACTORS: Documentation of impact forces and injuries, seat restraints, evacuation, emergency planning and rescue response

== AAIU Participation in Foreign Investigations ==
A Foreign State has an International obligation to inform the AAIU of any aircraft accident or serious incident subject to an investigation in that State that concerns Ireland, as a specified State, and to invite its participation in that investigation.

The AAIU may participate in the foreign investigation in one of the following capacities:

As the Irish Accredited Representative (ACCREP) representing Ireland as the State of Registry and / or State of the Operator. The AAIU will also be entitled to appoint an ACCREP even if it only provides, on request, information, facilities or experts to a State conducting an investigation. As an 'advisor' to the AAIU Inspector acting as the Irish ACCREP. As an 'expert' representing Ireland as a State having suffered fatalities or serious injuries to its citizens. As an 'observer' accompanying an AAIU Inspector acting as an ACCREP or assisting a foreign investigation directly when an Irish ACCREP is not entitled to be appointed. The ACCREP participation can be achieved through a “Travelling ACCREP”, who will actually visit the occurrence site abroad, or through a “Non-Travelling ACCREP” who will remain in Ireland and provide assistance through correspondence.

== Investigation Reporting ==
The extent of an AAIU investigation is determined by the Chief Inspector, taking into account the lessons that the investigation may hold for the prevention of future accidents. The type of Report published and the associated timelines are generally related to the severity and scale of the occurrence and the extent in which the occurrence is being investigated.

For a high-profile occurrence that involves fatalities, significant serious injuries or extensive damage to the aircraft, a Preliminary Report may be published approximately 30 days after the event occurred. The Preliminary Report will only identify factual information known at that time and will not contain any analysis of the factual information, conclusions, or probable cause.

High-profile occurrences will follow the full ICAO Annex 13 Formal Report format covering all aspects of an investigation. Such Formal Reports are complex and because each investigation is methodical and scientifically reviewed, determining the exact length of the investigation is difficult. However, where the investigation extends beyond a year, an Interim Statement will be released at least at each anniversary of the occurrence.

For occurrences that do not include fatalities a Synoptic Report will be published. In general, the investigation process is somewhat shorter, as only specific and relevant aspects of the full ICAO Annex 13 Report format need to be covered.

For relatively minor events a Factual Report will be published outlining the basic facts only. This Factual Report will not provide analysis, but may contain brief AAIU comment.

== Family Assistance ==
The AAIU will provide specific information to assist the victims of air accidents and their relatives, provided that information does not compromise the objectives of the safety investigation. In general terms, this information will relate to the investigation process, the timelines associated with the investigation and the issuance of Reports.

For fatal and/or serious injury general aviation and sport flying type occurrences, the AAIU will communicate directly with the relevant families.

For fatal and/or serious injury public transport type occurrences, the Department of Transport, Tourism and Sport will appoint a reference person as a point of contact who will communicate directly with the relevant families.

== Laboratory Capabilities ==
The AAIU operates its own technical laboratory and has the capability to download a number of different aircraft Cockpit Voice Recorders (CVR) - Flight Data Recorders (FDR) and generate flight analysis simulations using “FLIGHTSCAPE”.

Where recorders are damaged or are outside of our current download capabilities, the recorders will be brought under AAIU escort to an appropriate download facility abroad. The download will be under the supervision of the AAIU and all downloaded data will be escorted back to the AAIU.

== Safety Recommendations ==
At any stage of an investigation the AAIU may identify a preventative action that it considers necessary to be taken promptly to enhance aviation safety. This is achieved through a safety recommendation (SR). Timeliness is an essential part of the safety recommendation process.

As a result, the AAIU may issue an Interim SR as soon as a very serious safety issue is identified, without waiting for an accident investigation to be completed and the probable cause determined. Final Reports may contain SRs that seek to enhance aviation safety in general.

An SR shall in no case create a presumption of blame or liability for an occurrence.

== Gallery ==
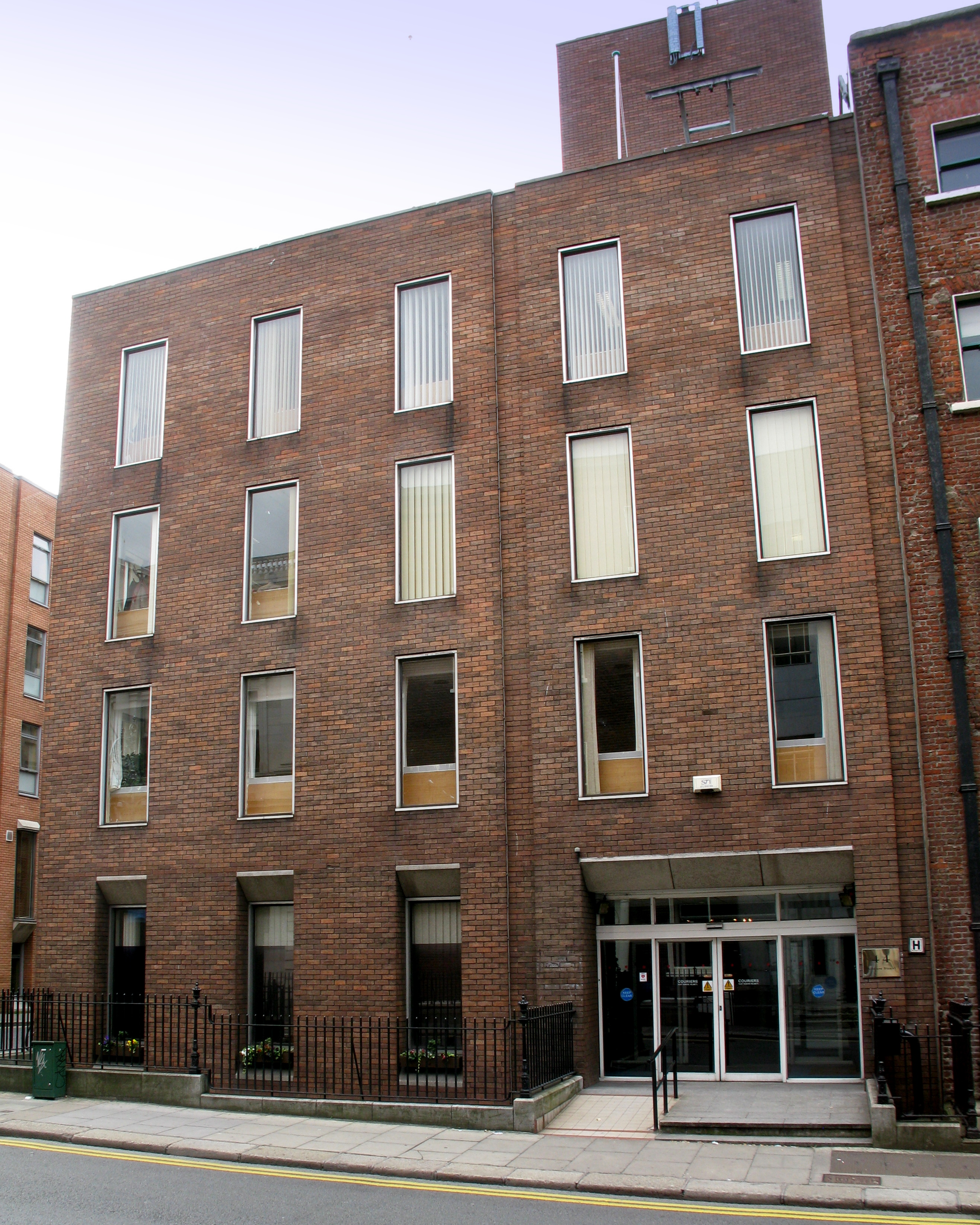
Transport House, formerly the head office of the AAIU

== See also ==
- 2017 Irish Coast Guard S-92 crash
- Irish Aviation Authority
- Manx2 Flight 7100
- Railway Accident Investigation Unit
