= 2017 Irish Coast Guard Rescue 116 crash =

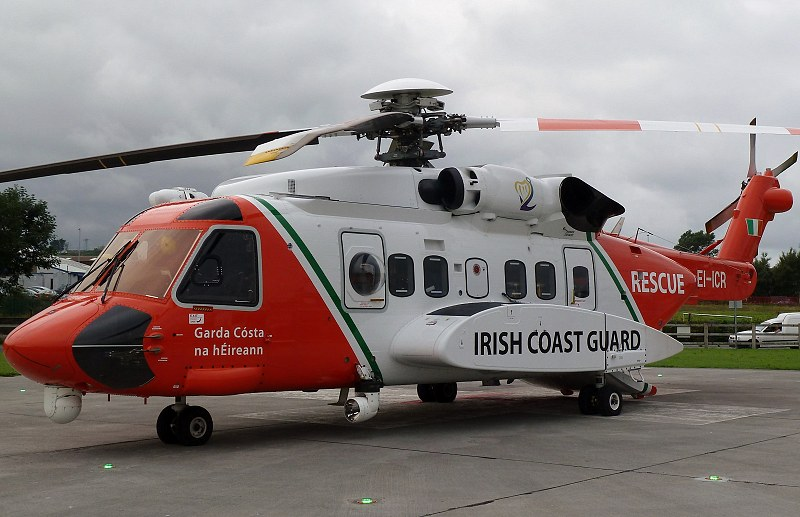
- EI-ICR, the helicopter involved, photographed in 2013

Accident
- Date: 14 March 2017
- Summary: Controlled flight into terrain in poor weather, at night
- Site: Blackrock Island, County Mayo, Ireland; 54.0669°N 10.3202°W

Aircraft
- Aircraft type: Sikorsky S-92A
- Operator: CHC Helicopter for Irish Coast Guard
- Call sign: Rescue 116
- Registration: EI-ICR
- Flight origin: Dublin Airport, Ireland
- Stopover: Blacksod Lighthouse, Ireland
- Occupants: 4
- Crew: 4
- Fatalities: 4
- Survivors: 0

Location of crash site

In the early hours of 14 March 2017, a Sikorsky S-92 helicopter operated by CHC Helicopter under contract to the Irish Coast Guard (call sign Rescue 116) crashed into Blackrock Island while supporting a rescue operation off County Mayo, on Ireland's west coast. All four crew members on board, Captain Dara Fitzpatrick, Chief Pilot Mark Duffy, winch operator Paul Ormsby, and winch man Ciarán Smith were killed.

== Events ==
During the evening of 13 March 2017, the Malin Head Coastguard took a call from the captain of a fishing boat 250 kilometres (130 nmi) off the west coast, who reported that one of his crew had suffered an accident in which he had lost part of his thumb. The decision was made to evacuate the casualty to hospital, and two helicopters were despatched for this purpose: Rescue 118 would winch the injured fisherman on board and transport him to land, while Rescue 116 would provide communications relay support.

Rescue 118 took off from its base at Sligo at around 10:30 and, after a refuelling stop at Blacksod Lighthouse, proceeded to meet the fishing boat. Rescue 116, based in Dublin, took off just before 11pm, and headed to Blacksod to refuel, a journey of 1¾ hours. Approaching Blacksod over the sea at 200', the crew failed to see Blackrock Island, 9.5nmi west of Blacksod, until it was too late. Despite a last-moment evasive manoeuvre, at 12:46am the helicopter struck the western slope of the island. The collision damaged the tail structure rendering the helicopter uncontrollable, and it tumbled into the sea off the eastern side of Blackrock. The alarm was raised by the crew of the lighthouse when the helicopter failed to arrive as expected, prompting the Marine Rescue Coordination Centre (MRCC) in Dublin to declare an emergency.

Once Rescue 118 had finished winching the injured fisherman on board, it flew to Blacksod where it located the body of R116's captain in the water; the body was retrieved by the RNLI Achill lifeboat. Rescue 115, the Shannon-based Coast Guard helicopter, was dispatched to the area to aid in the search for the other three crew members, along with a CASA CN-235 maritime patrol aircraft from the Irish Air Corps.

On 18 March, the funeral for Captain Dara Fitzpatrick was held, in Glencullen, County Dublin.

== Wreckage recovery and search for the missing ==
The Irish Naval Service offshore patrol vessel LÉ Róisín arrived in the search zone at 9:00 am on 14 March. Divers from the Naval Service Diving Section and Garda Water Unit were also sent to the scene. The Naval Service flagship LÉ Eithne joined the search effort that afternoon, and both Naval Service vessels continued the search throughout the night and into the next day. Eithne was made on-scene coordinator of the recovery mission. The Marine Institute's RV Celtic Voyager was dispatched on the night of 14 March to search using multibeam echosounders to help locate the wreckage.

The Commissioners of Irish Lights sent the ILV Granuaile, an advanced multifunctional vessel, to the scene. The vessel is equipped with a dynamic positioning system which allows it to operate in difficult sea conditions, cranes capable of hoisting recovered wreckage and a helicopter platform. The Marine Institute's work class ROV Holland one was mobilised onto the Granuaile in Galway harbour. The Geological Survey of Ireland surveyed the underwater region and carried out detailed mapping where the search was focused on to aid diving teams in the recovery of the wreckage. The Navy's LÉ Samuel Beckett later joined the recovery efforts and assumed command as the on-scene coordinator.

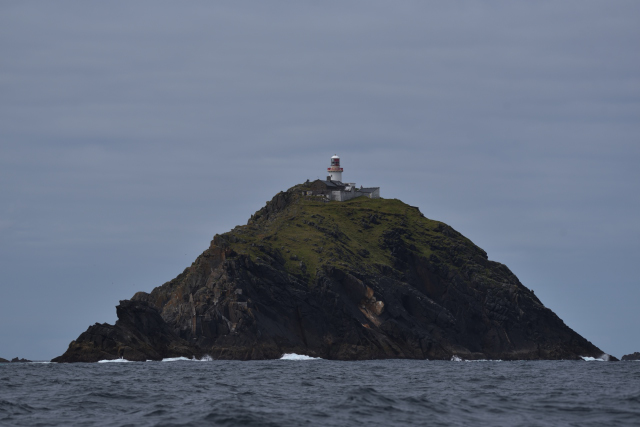
Blackrock

On the afternoon of 15 March, a signal transmitting from the helicopter's multi-purpose flight recorder (Note: The multi-purpose flight recorder installed on EI-ICR combines the traditional functions of CVR and FDR in a single unit) was detected by a team from the Irish Marine Institute using USBL equipment from a local fishing vessel. The signal emanated at around 50 metres (55 yd) southeast of Blackrock Island, and on 22 March, the main wreckage of R116 was located on the sea bed at a depth of 40m by the Marine Institute Holland 1 ROV.

Naval Service divers reached the helicopter on 24 March and recovered the flight recorder. The black box had some superficial damage, and was flown to the UK Air Accidents Investigation Branch where the data were downloaded. Two days later divers removed the body of co-pilot Mark Duffy from the cockpit and brought it to the surface. The funeral for Captain Duffy was held in County Louth on 30 March.

Throughout the recovery attempts weather and sea conditions forced diving to be suspended for long periods for safety reasons. The large sea surface and underwater swells and currents around Blackrock Island made it dangerous for divers to operate and decompress safely from 40m depths. In tandem with wreckage salvage there were extensive aerial, sea and coastline searches.

On the evening of 2 April, the main bulk of the helicopter was raised from the sea and placed aboard the Irish Lights vessel Granuaile. After the lifting of the wreckage, it was confirmed that there was still no sighting of either winch operator Paul Ormsby or winch man Ciáran Smith.

Families of the missing crewman appealed for fishermen and seafarers to join in the search, and on the weekend of 8-9 April 2017 over 110 fishing vessels joined RNLI lifeboats, Irish Coast Guard and others in a co-ordinated sweep of over 8,500 square kilometres from Blacksod to Donegal in one of the largest sea searches in Irish maritime history. Granuaile and its ROV returned to the site in July to make another search of the seabed for the missing crew members, without success.

== Air Corps resourcing issues ==
The use of Rescue 116 to provide communications relay support on this mission was a second choice. The Coast Guard had first asked the Defence Forces for the use of one of their CASA CN-235 maritime patrol aircraft to undertake this task. The use of the fixed-wing CN-235 is generally considered preferable in this role because it can reach the scene quicker and remain on station for longer than a helicopter can, but on the night of 13-14 March this was not possible because of a staff shortage in experienced and trained personnel which made it unable to operate an "out-of-hours" roster. This was the third time in 2017 that such a request was refused due to reduced availability.

At 1:45 am, an hour after last contact from Rescue 116, the Coast Guard made an emergency request for assistance to the Air Corps to help search for the missing SAR helicopter. The Air Corps activated its recall plan and 3 hours and 45 minutes after the Coast Guard's initial request for communications relay support, a CASA CN-235 maritime patrol aircraft was airborne.

Since the crash took place, there have remained safety concerns for search and rescue helicopter services in Ireland, with problems including cartographic errors and omissions, problems with the navigational software, inadequate life jackets and a lack of oversight of the Search and Rescue service.

== Investigation ==
The investigation on the accident was conducted by the Air Accident Investigation Unit. Two of its investigators arrived in Blacksod on the morning of the accident.

On 16 March, AAIU investigators were airlifted onto Blackrock, where they recovered some debris from the helicopter: the horizontal stabiliser, a wheel rim, parts of the intermediate gear box (located at the base of the tail), and small fragments of the tail rotor. From the examination of these items AAIU investigators believe that the helicopter had clipped the island close to the lighthouse, and subsequently crashed out of control into the sea. Blackrock was registered in the craft's GPS mapping system but not on EGPWS, a legacy capable Class A terrain awareness and warning system designed for digitally equipped aircraft.

The AAIU found no mechanical anomalies from the flight recorder data, and therefore no additional safety actions were required on similar helicopter types.

Initially the Air Accident Investigation Unit was due to release an initial version of the final report into the crash in November 2019. But the report was delayed, because it needed to be reviewed, this is the first report to be reviewed in the 25-year history of the AAIU.

At the end the final report was released by the Air Accident Investigation Unit on 5 November 2021 after a two-year extension due to the review. Concluding that the probable cause was that while the helicopter was flying towards its intended landing spot at 200 ft, at night, in poor weather, the crew was unaware of the presence of a 282-foot obstacle in their flight path.

== Tributes ==
Just three weeks before its fatal crash, Rescue 116 with the same four crew members appeared briefly in the 1st episode of 3rd season of the Irish TV show Paramedics. A tribute was made by the paramedics involved in that episode.
