= List of towns, villages and places of interest in the Barony of Erris =

These places are in Ireland.

- Belmullet
- Bangor Erris
- Doohoma
- Doolough
- Geesala
- Pollathomas
- Barroosky
- Aughleam
- Glenamoy
- Glengad
- Rossport
- Inver
- Barnatra
- Carrowteige
- Cill Ghallagáin
- Erris Head
- Mullet Peninsula
- Bellacorick
- Benwee Head
- Porturlin
- Portacloy
- Pullathomas
- Carrowmore Lake
- Glencullen, County Mayo
- Glenamoy
- Ballycroy National Park
- Nephin
- Broadhaven Bay
- Blacksod Bay
