= List of towns and villages in County Mayo =

List of towns and villages in a county of Ireland

This is a list of towns and villages in County Mayo, Ireland.

== A ==
- Achill Sound
- Attymass

== B ==
- Balla
- Ballina
- Ballindine
- Ballinrobe
- Ballintubber
- Ballycastle
- Ballycroy
- Ballyhaunis
- Ballyglass
- Bangor
- Belcarra
- Bellacorick
- Bellavary
- Belmullet
- Bohola
- Bonniconlon
- Breaffy
- Brickens

== C ==
- Carracastle
- Carrowteige
- Castlebar
- Charlestown
- Claremorris
- Cong
- Corroy
- Crossmolina

== D ==
- Dooagh

== F ==
- Fallmore
- Foxford

== G ==
- Glenamoy
- Gweesalia

== H ==
- Hollymount

== I ==
- Islandeady
- Irishtown

== K ==
- Keel
- Kilkelly
- Killala
- Kilmaine
- Kilmovee
- Kiltimagh
- Knockmore
- Knock

== L ==
- Lahardane
- Louisburgh

== M ==
- Mayo
- Mulranny
- Murrisk

== N ==
- Newport

== P ==
- Partry
- Pollagh
- Pontoon
- Portacloy
- Porturlin
- Pullathomas (Pollatomish)

== R ==
- Rossport

== S ==
- Shrule
- Swinford

== T ==
- Tourmakeady
- Turlough

== W ==
- Westport
