= Rundale =

Form of occupation of land in Ireland

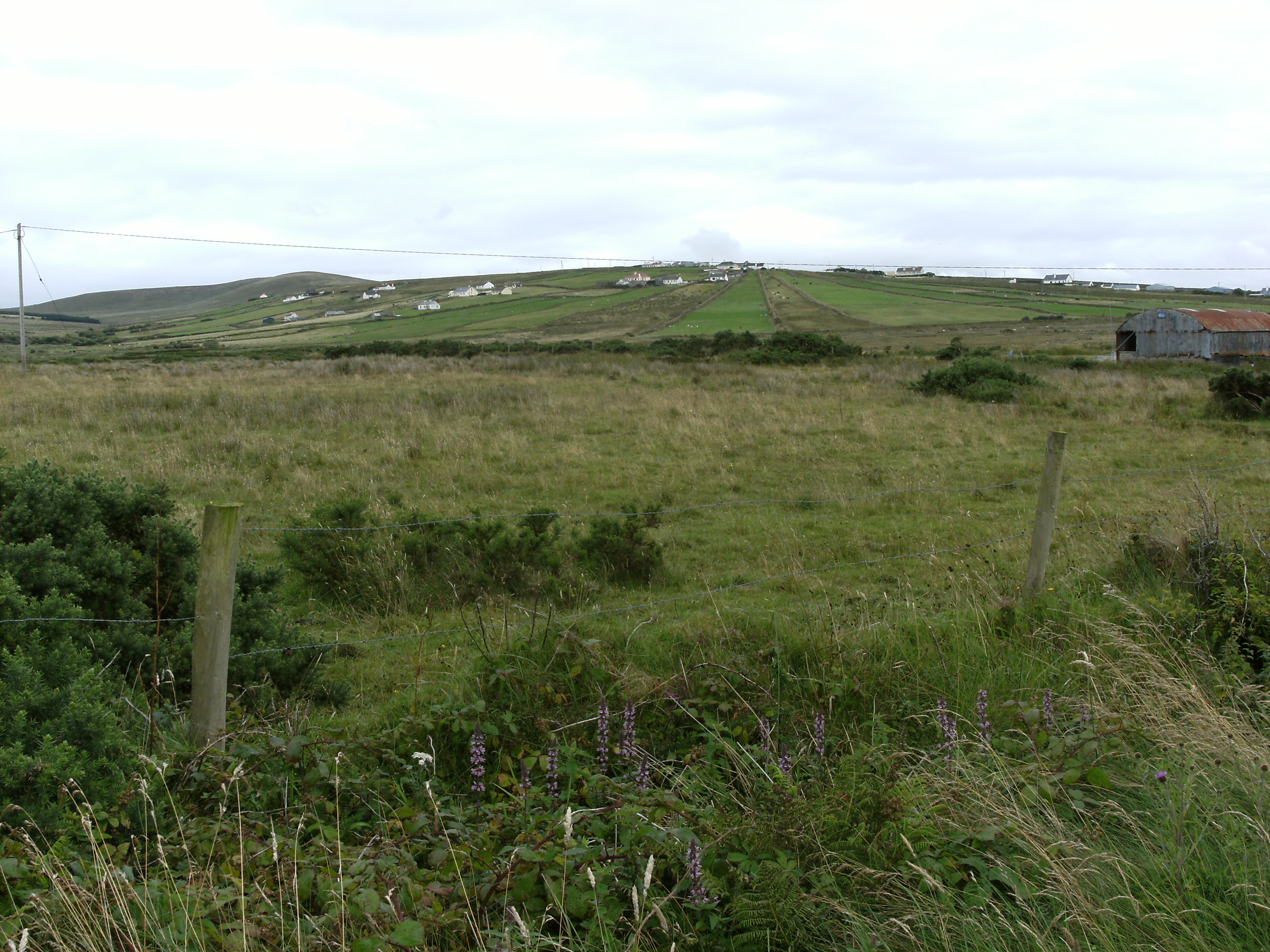
Rundale clachan patterns of settlement still visible in Inver, Kilcommon, Erris, County Mayo, Ireland

The rundale system (apparently from the Irish Gaelic words "roinn" which refers to the division of something and "dáil", in the sense of apportionment) was a form of occupation of land in Ireland. The land is divided into discontinuous plots, and cultivated and occupied by a number of tenants to whom it is leased jointly. The system was common in Ireland, especially in the western counties. In Scotland, where the system also existed, it was termed run rig (with the first element either from the Scottish Gaelic roinn or the English run, and the second from the Lowland Scots rig or ridge).

== History ==
Rundale farming systems in Ireland existed from the Early Medieval Period right up until the time of the First World War. The rundale system of agriculture consisted of nucleated villages known as clachans. Usually the land was of poor quality and the population of people trying to make a living was intensive.

The main "clachan" area where the small thatched cottages were concentrated, was situated in a cluster on the best land (the infields) which was surrounded by mountain or grazing land of inferior quality (the outfields) where the livestock was grazed during summer or dry periods, a practice known as transhumance or as "booleying". All the sheep or cattle of the village were grazed together to alleviate pressure on growing crops and also provided fresh pasture for livestock. In the remote western areas of Ireland where the rundale system was most commonly seen, the land was a complex mixture of arable, rough and bogland. It was a difficult task to ensure that each tenant had an equal share of good and poor land.

Rundale clachans and their transhumance pastures, also known as Booley, Boley, Bouley, Bualie and Boola can still be seen in the parish of Kilcommon in Erris, County Mayo, in many townlands such as Gortmelia, Inver and Glengad where clusters of cottages can be seen on the hillsides with land in narrow strips running down to the sea. These names survive in place names such as Buaile h'Anraoi in Kilcommon where the landscape still shows very clearly the layout of the Rundale system.

The practise of booleying provided a safety valve in that it allowed maximisation of available human resources. Seasonal migration to Scotland and England superseded this ancient system and went hand-in-hand with more permanent emigration to the United States. Booleying alleviated pressure on the growing crops and provided fresh pasture for livestock while the migratory worker to the potato fields of Ayrshire or Lothian earned sufficient income to allow him and his family to live at home for most of the year. The average holding on the small farms of County Mayo was only five acres, insufficient to maintain a family for more than part of the year.

Booleying is mentioned in the Brehon Laws.

== Primitive communism ==
The agrarian communes of the rundale system in Ireland have subsequently been assessed using a framework of primitive communism, where the system fits Karl Marx and Friedrich Engels' definition.

== Sources ==
- Jordan, Donald E. (1994). Land and Popular Politics in Ireland: County Mayo from the Plantation to the Land War. Cambridge: Cambridge University Press. doi:10.1017/CBO9780511560644. ISBN 9780511560644.
- McDonald, Theresa (1997). Achill Island: Archaeology - History - Folklore. Longford.
