= Primitive communism =

Mode of production

Primitive communism is a way of describing the gift economies of hunter-gatherers throughout history, where resources and property hunted or gathered are shared with all members of a group in accordance with individual needs. In political sociology and anthropology, it is also a concept (often credited to Karl Marx and Friedrich Engels), that describes hunter-gatherer societies as traditionally being based on egalitarian social relations and common ownership. A primary inspiration for both Marx and Engels were Lewis H. Morgan's descriptions of "communism in living" as practised by the Haudenosaunee of North America. In Marx's model of socioeconomic structures, societies with primitive communism had no hierarchical social class structures or capital accumulation.

The idea has been criticised by anthropologists as too ethnocentrically European a model to be applied to other societies, whilst also romanticising non-European societies. Anthropologists, such as Margaret Mead, argue that private property exists in hunter-gatherer and other "primitive societies" and provide examples that Marx and subsequent theorists label as personal property, not private property.

== Development of the idea ==
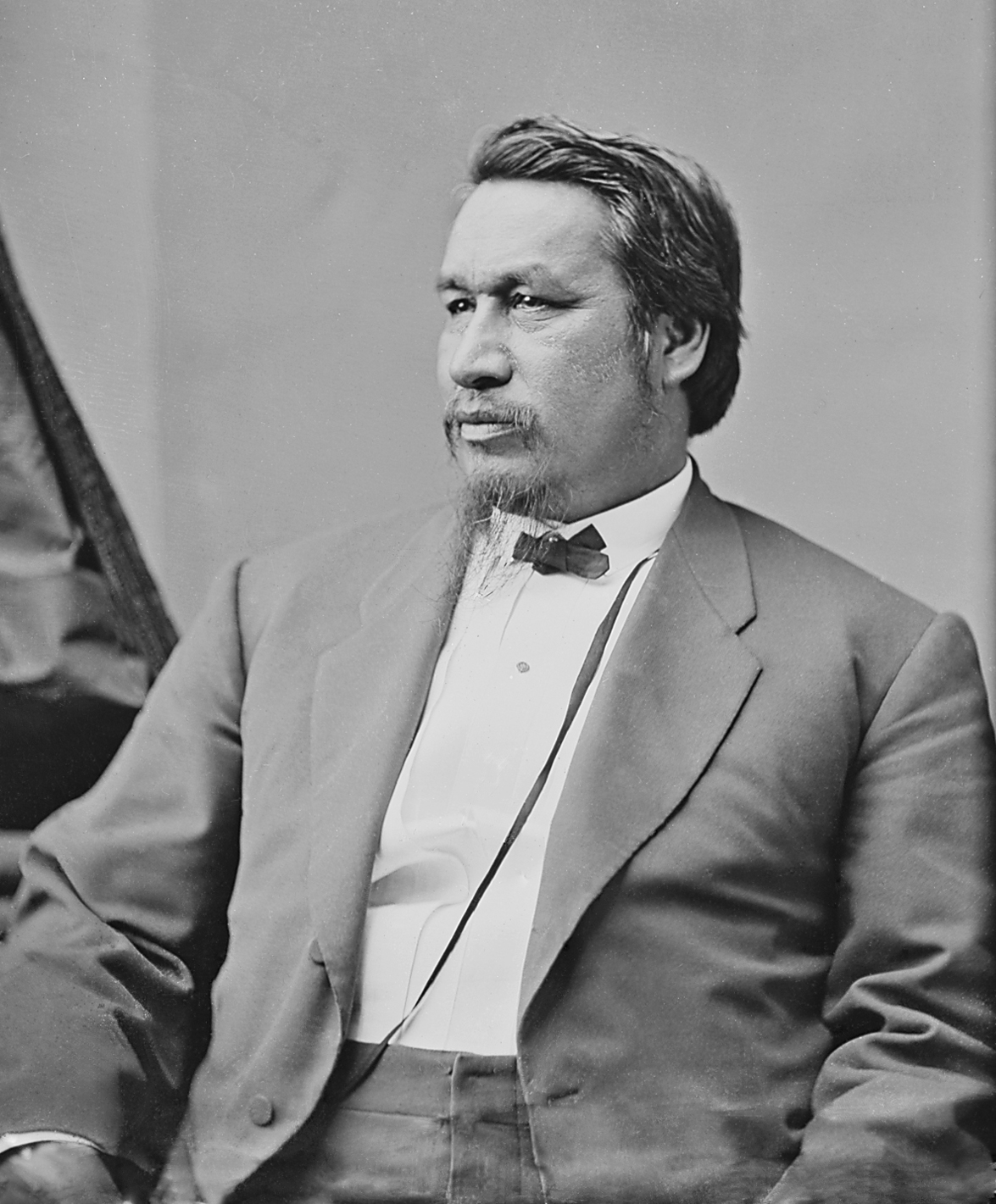
Ely S. Parker

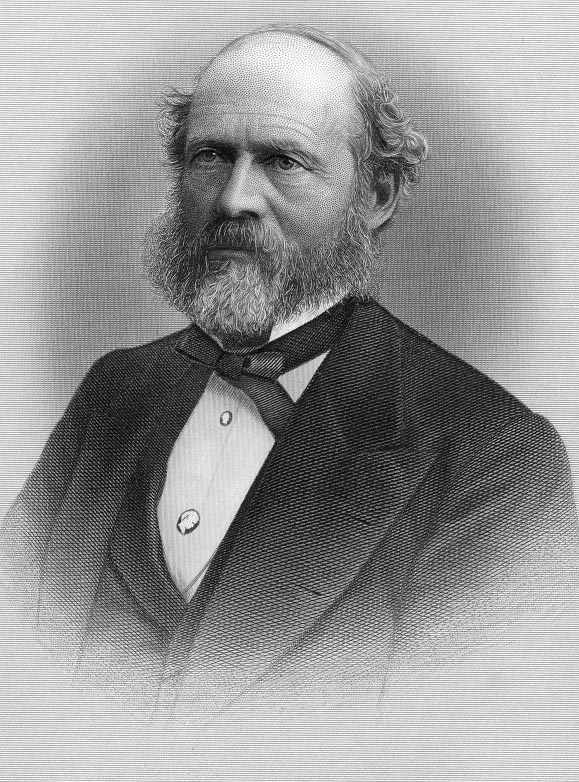
Lewis H. Morgan

The original idea of primitive communism is rooted in the idea of the noble savage present in the works of Jean-Jacques Rousseau and the early anthropological work of Morgan and Ely S. Parker.

In his Discourse on Inequality, Rousseau depicted the state of nature as a "primitivist utopia" and stated that agriculture led to the development of social inequality and habitat destruction.

Engels was the first to write about primitive communism in detail, with the 1884 publication of The Origin of the Family, Private Property and the State. Engels categorised primitive communist societies into two phases: the "wild" (hunter-gatherer) phase that lacked permanent superstructure and had close relationships with the natural world, and the "barbarian" phase which held a superstructure like that of the ancient Germanic populations beyond the borders of the Roman Empire and the Indigenous peoples of North America before colonisation by Europeans, being intra-communally egalitarian and matrilineal within the community.

Marx and Engels used the term more broadly than Marxists did later, and applied it not only to hunter-gatherers but also to some communities that engaged in subsistence agriculture. There is also no agreement among later scholars, including Marxists, on the historical extent, or longevity, of primitive communism. Marx and Engels also noted how capitalist accumulation latched itself onto social organizations of primitive communism. For instance, in private correspondence the same year that The Origin of the Family was published, Engels attacked European colonialism, describing the Dutch regime in Java directly organizing agricultural production and profiting from it, "on the basis of the old communistic village communities". He added that cases like the Dutch East Indies, British India and the Russian Empire showed "how today primitive communism furnishes ... the finest and broadest basis of exploitation".

Anarchists, including Peter Kropotkin and Élisée Reclus, believed that societies that exemplified primitive communism were also examples of anarchist society before industrialisation. An example of this is Kropotkin's anthropological work on anarchism and gift economies, Mutual Aid: A Factor of Evolution, which uses a study of the San people of southern Africa for its thesis.

In the 20th and 21st centuries Ernest Mandel, Rosa Luxemburg, Ian Hodder, Marija Gimbutas and developed upon the original thesis of primitive communism. Some non-Marxist scholars of prehistory and early history did not take the term seriously, although it was occasionally engaged with and often dismissed. The term primitive communism first appeared in Russian scholarship in the late 19th century, with references to primitive communism existing in ancient Crete. However, it was not researched in any depth until the 20th century, with work such as that of the ethnographer Dmitry Konstantinovich Zelenin, who looked at non-hunter-gatherer societies within the Soviet Union to identify remnants of primitive communism within their societies.

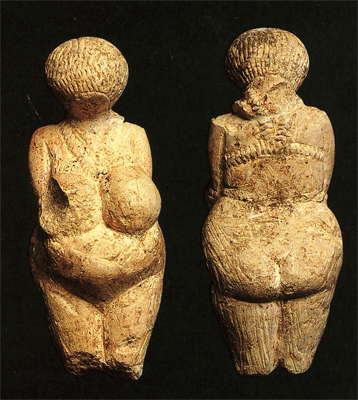
Venus figurine found in the Kostyonki–Borshchyovo archaeological complex, Russia

The belief of primitive communism as based on Morgan's work is inaccurate due to Morgan's misunderstandings of Haudenosaunee society and his since-disproven theory of social evolution. Subsequent and more accurate research has focused on hunter-gatherer societies and aspects of such societies in relation to land ownership, communal ownership, and criminality and justice. A newer definition of primitive communism could be summarized as societies that practice economic cooperation among the members of their community, where almost every member of a community has their own contribution to society and land and natural resources are often shared peacefully among the community.

From the 20th century onward, sociologists and archaeologists have looked at the application of the term of primitive communism to hunter-gatherer societies of the Paleolithic through to horticultural societies of the Chalcolithic, including Paleo-American societies from the lithic stage through the archaic period. Soviet archaeologists, influenced by Morgan's and Engels' works, interpreted the various Paleolithic cultures that created Venus figures, many of which were found in the Soviet Union in the 1920s and 1930s, as evidence of the societies being primitive communist and matriarchal in nature. The psychoanalyst Wilhelm Reich concluded in 1931 the existence of an early communism from the information in Bronisław Malinowski's work. However, Malinowski and the philosopher Erich Fromm did not consider this conclusion to be compelling. Ernest Borneman supported Reich's ideas in his 1975 work Das Patriarchat.

R. Heber Newton writing in the Unitarian Review and Religious Magazine in 1881, noted how various observers had found evidence of ancient societies with systems similar to that of Communism:

Sir Henry Maine, in his studies of Ancient Law, pointed out that property once belonged not to individuals, nor even to isolated families, but to large societies. His researches among the village communities of India opened an archaic society which was a true Communism. Danish, German, and English students, in their explorations of the origins of civilization, came upon the same ancient social order, among widely separated peoples; and the Belgian Leveleye wrought these scattered investigations into a masterly treatise, which conclusively shows, in so far as our present knowledge goes, that the general system of property was once Communism.

== Primitive communist societies ==
=== Characteristics ===
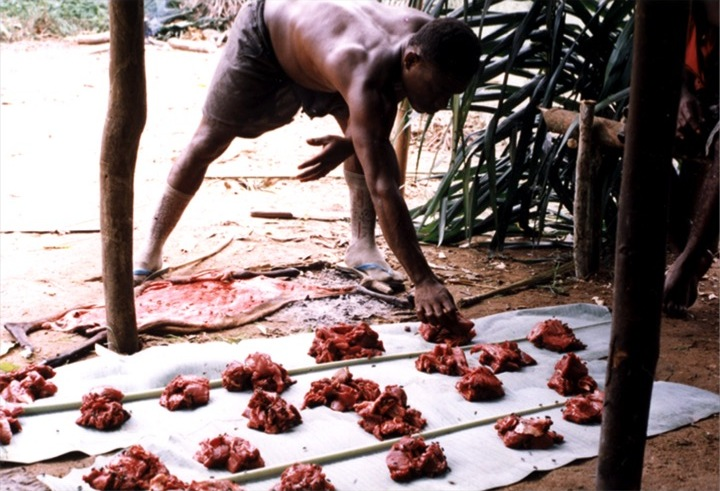
Mbendjele hunter-gatherer meat sharing

In a primitive communist society, the productive forces would have consisted of all able-bodied persons engaged in obtaining food and resources from the land, and everyone would share in what was produced by hunting and gathering. There would be no private property, which is distinguished from personal property such as articles of clothing and similar personal items, because primitive society produced no surplus; what was produced was quickly consumed and this was because there existed no division of labour, hence people were forced to work together. The few things that existed for any length of time - the means of production (tools and land), housing - were held communally. In Engels' view, in association with matrilocal residence and matrilineal descent, reproductive labour was shared. There would have also been a lack of state.

A term usually associated with Karl Marx, but most fully elaborated by Friedrich Engels (in The Origin of the Family, 1884), and referring to the collective right to basic resources, egalitarianism in social relationships, and absence of authoritarian rule and hierarchy that is supposed to have preceded stratification and exploitation in human history. Both Marx and Engels were heavily influenced by Lewis Henry Morgan's speculative evolutionary history, which described the "liberty, equality and fraternity of the ancient gentes", and the "communism in living" said to be evident in the village architecture of native Americans.

— John Scott and Gordon Marshall, 2007, Dictionary of Sociology.

Domestication of animals and plants following the Neolithic Revolution through herding and agriculture, and the subsequent urban revolution, were seen as the turning point from primitive communism to class society, as this transition was followed by the appearance of private ownership and slavery, with the inequality that those entail. In addition, parts of the population began to specialize in different activities, such as manufacturing, culture, philosophy, and science which lead in part to social stratification and the development of social classes.

Egalitarian and communist-like hunter-gatherer societies have been studied and described by many well-known social anthropologists including James Woodburn, Richard Borshay Lee, Alan Barnard and Jerome Lewis. Anthropologists such as Christopher Boehm, Chris Knight and Lewis offer theoretical accounts to explain how communistic, assertively egalitarian social arrangements might have emerged in the prehistoric past. Despite differences in emphasis, these and other anthropologists follow Engels in arguing that evolutionary change—resistance to primate-style sexual and political dominance—culminated eventually in a revolutionary transition. Lee criticizes the mainstream and dominant culture's long-time bias against the idea of primitive communism, deriding "Bourgeois ideology [that] would have us believe that primitive communism doesn't exist. In popular consciousness it is lumped with romanticism, exoticism: the noble savage."

Papers have argued that the depiction of hunter-gatherers as egalitarian is misleading. According to one paper published in Current Anthropology, while levels of inequality were low, they were still present, with the average hunter-gatherer group having a Gini coefficient of 0.25 (for comparison, this was attained by the nation of Denmark in 2007). This argument is in part supported by Alain Testart and others, who have said that a society without property is not free from problems of exploitation, domination or wars. Marx and Engels, however, did not argue that communism brought about equality, as according to them equality was a concept without connection in physical reality. Testart does support Engels' observations that societies without surplus are economically egalitarian and conversely that societies with surplus are unequal.

Arnold Petersen has used the existence of primitive communism to argue against the idea that communism goes against human nature. Hikmet Kıvılcımlı in his The Thesis of History argued that in pre-capitalist societies, the main dynamic of historical change "was not class struggle within society but rather the strong collective action" of egalitarian and collectivist values of "primitive socialist society".

=== Example societies ===
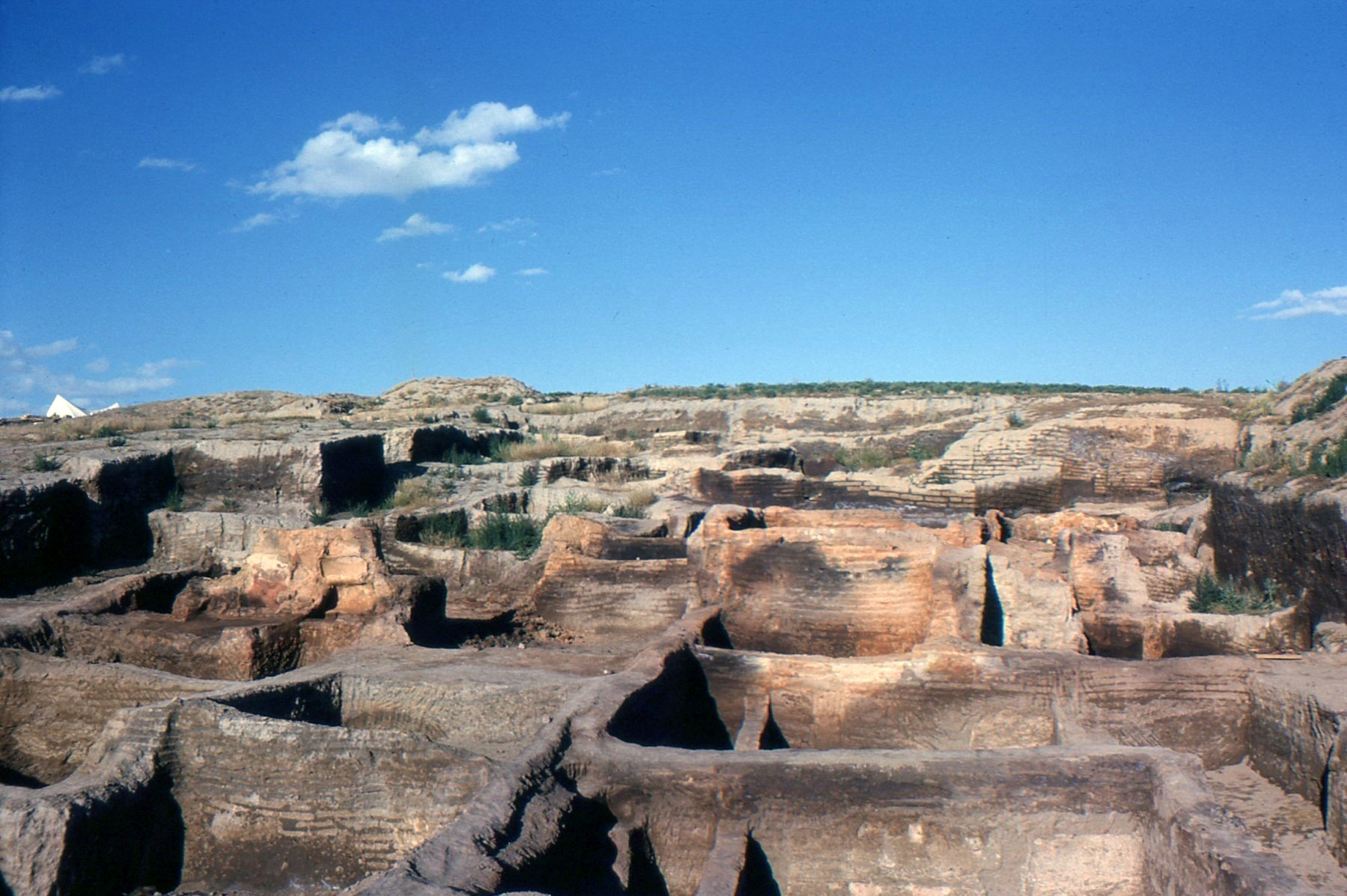
Çatalhöyük after the first excavations

Due to the strong evidence of an egalitarian society, lack of hierarchy, and lack of economic inequality, historian Murray Bookchin has argued that Çatalhöyük was an early example of anarcho-communism, and so an example of primitive communism in a proto-city. However, still others use Çatalhöyük as an example that refutes the concept of primitive communism. Similarly, it has been argued that the Indus Valley Civilisation is an example of a primitive communist society due to its perceived lack of conflict and social hierarchies. Daniel Miller and others argue that such an assessment of the Indus Valley Civilisation is not correct.

The Marxist archaeologist V. Gordon Childe carried out excavations in Scotland from the 1920s and concluded that there was a Neolithic classless society that reached as far as the Orkney Islands. This has been supported by Perry Anderson, who has argued that primitive communism was prevalent in pre-Roman western Europe. Descriptions of such societies are also present in the works of classical authors.

Biblical scholars have also argued that the mode of production seen in early Hebrew society was a communitarian domestic one that was akin to primitive communism. Claude Meillassoux has commented on how the mode of production seen in many primitive societies is a communistic domestic one.

The Indian communist politician Shripad Amrit Dange considered ancient Indian society to be of a primitive communist nature. Other communists within India have also labelled the societies of current indigenous groups, such as the Adivasi, as examples of primitive communism. In Alfred Radcliffe-Brown's study of the Andamanese at the beginning of the 20th century he comments that they have "customs which result in an approach to communism" and "their domestic policy may be described as a communism". During the pre-Vedic era in India, there was (according to one observer) "a fully enlightened society having primitive communism as their way of life." According to one study, India moved about 1500 B.C. “from a primitive-communist society to a slave - system society in terms of social development.”

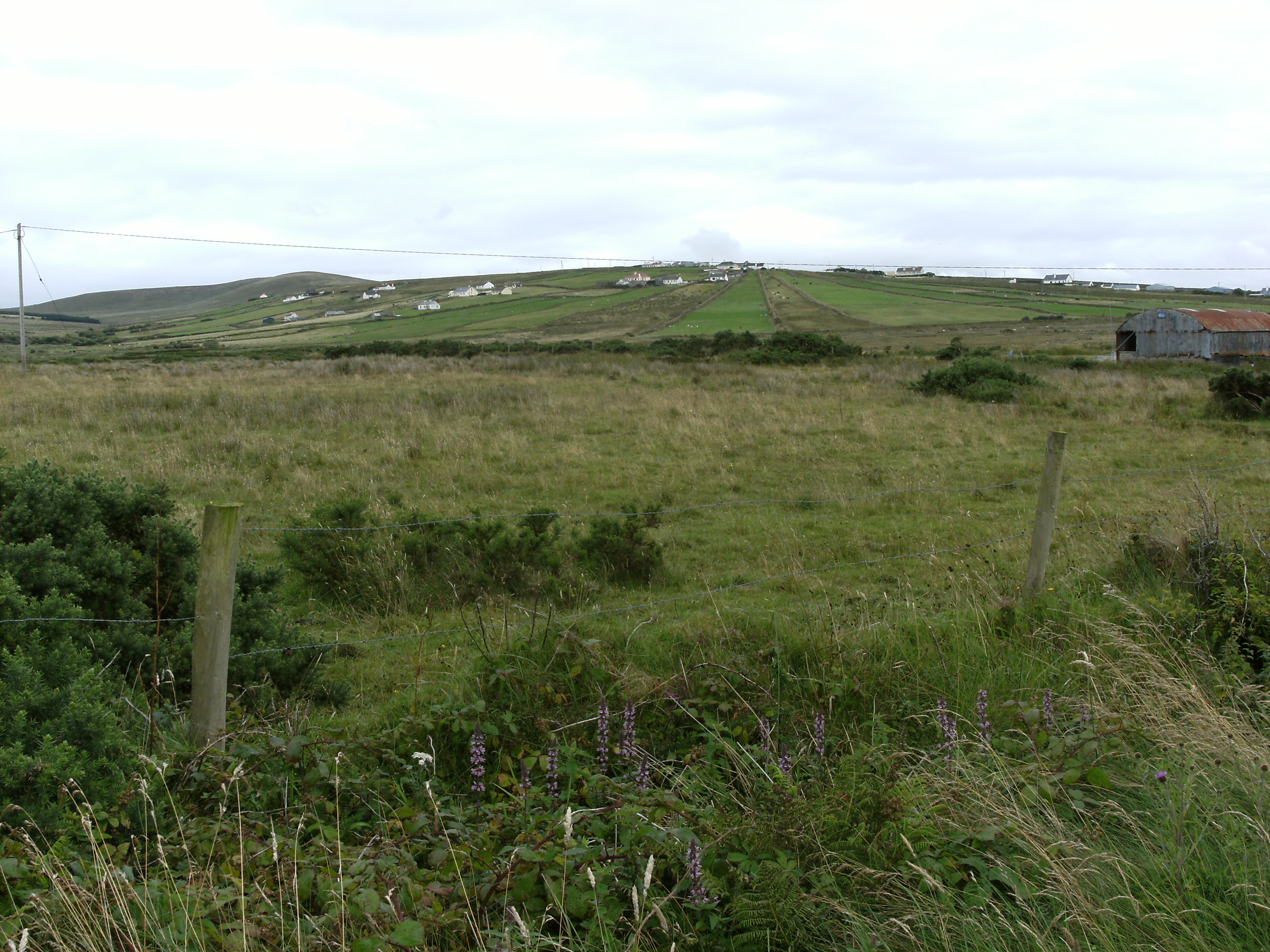
Rundale clachan patterns of settlement still visible in Inver, Kilcommon, Erris, County Mayo, Ireland

Alexander Mikhailovich Zolotarev, in his 1960 work on the development of religious cult communities from tribal communities in the Balkans, spoke of the primitive communism of the "archaic form of the tribal system".

Rolf Jensen in the 1980s conducted a historical study of Wolof society in west Africa looking at the development of class antagonisms from a primitive communist society. Also in the 1980s, Bourgeault looked at the forceful transition of indigenous societies in Canada from their traditional structures, which were anarchist and communistic in nature, into capitalist exploitation due to encroaching imperialism and colonialism. Such an area of interest has been a common topic of research for many fields beyond just Marxist scholars. Some anthropologists, such as John H. Moore, have continued to argue that societies such as those of Native Americans constitute primitive communist societies, whilst acknowledging and incorporating the research showing the complexity and diversity in native American societies.

James Connolly believed that "Gaelic primitive communism" existed in remnants in Irish society after it "had almost entirely disappeared" from much of western Europe. The agrarian communes of the rundale system in Ireland have subsequently been assessed using a framework of primitive communism, where the system fits Marx and Engels' definition. The Māori people have also been historically associated with primitive communism.

Soviet theorists and anthropologists, such as Lev Sternberg, considered some of the indigenous groups of Siberia and the Russian far east (such as the Nivkh) to be primitive communist in nature.

== Criticism ==
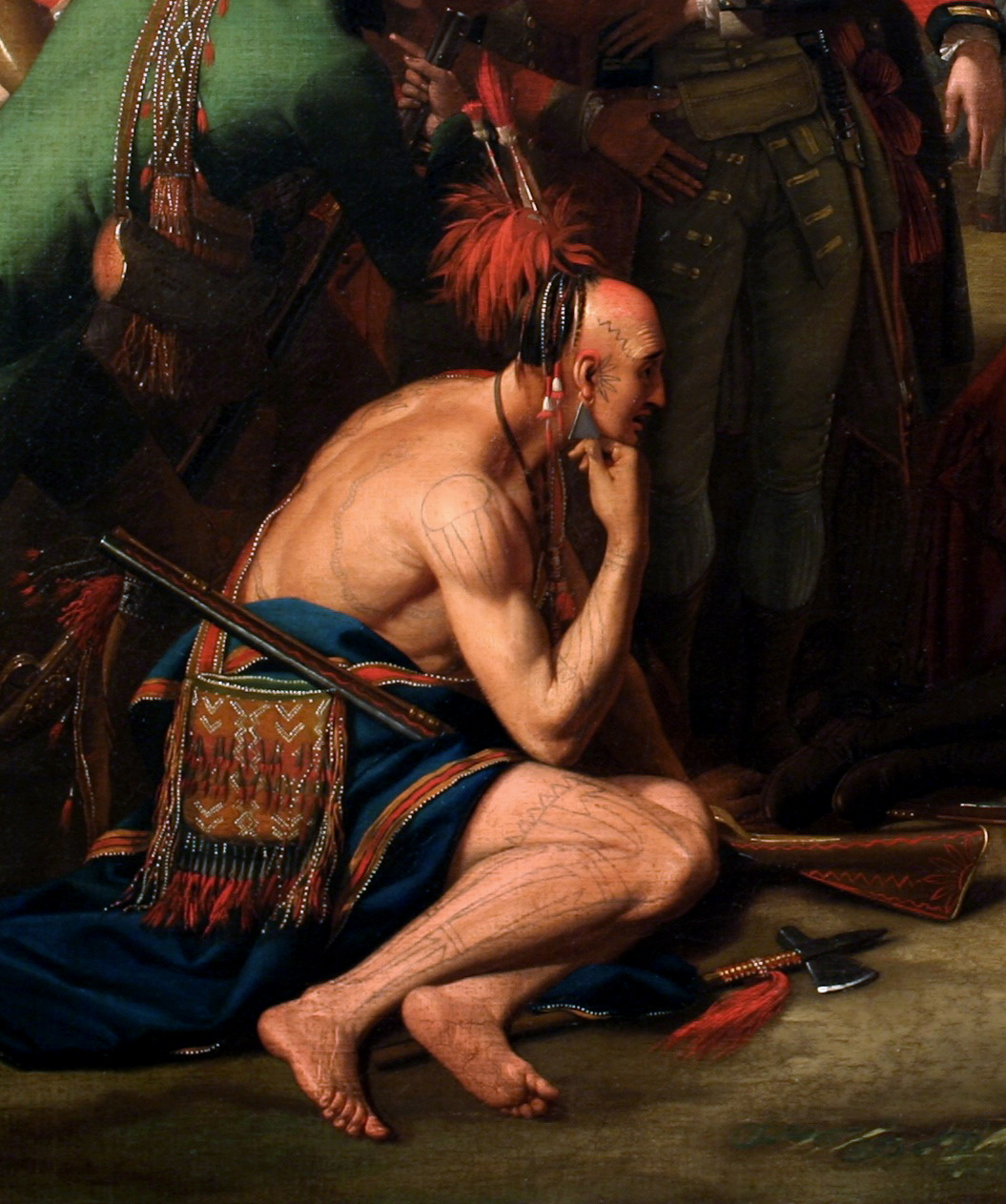
A detail from Benjamin West's heroic, neoclassical history painting, The Death of General Wolfe (1771), depicting an idealized indigenous American. An example of the romanticisation of indigenous and non-Western people.

Criticism of the idea of primitive communism relates to definitions of property, where anthropologists such as Margaret Mead argue that private property exists in hunter-gatherer and other "primitive societies" but provide examples that Marx and subsequent theorists label as personal property, not private property. Similar arguments have been made by other academics, such as the economist Richard Pipes. The idea has also been critiqued by other anthropologists for being based on Morgan's evolutionary model of society and for romanticising non‐Western societies.

Western and non-Western scholars have criticised applying models that are too ethnocentrically European to non-European societies. Western scholars, including Eleanor Leacock, have also criticised the ethnocentric point of view and biases in previous ethnographic research into hunter-gatherer societies. This is similar to criticism of adhering to stadialism in analysing cultures. Feminist scholars have criticised the idea of the lack of subjugation of women as suggested from the works of Engels, while Marxist feminists have been critical of and have reassessed Engels' ideas in The Origin of the Family related to the development of women's subjugation in the transition from primitive communism to class society.

The Marxian economist Ernest Mandel criticised the research of Soviet scholars on primitive communism due to the influence of "Soviet-Marxist ideology" in their social sciences work.

David Graeber and David Wengrow's The Dawn of Everything challenges the notion that humans ever lived in precarious, small-scale societies with little surplus. While they provide examples of sharing egalitarian societies in pre-history, they claim that a huge variety of complex societies (some with large cities) existed long before the supposed agricultural and then urban revolutions proposed by V. Gordon Childe. Graeber and Wengrow's understanding of hunter-gatherer societies has, however, been questioned by other anthropologists.

Anthropologist Manvir Singh argued that while some indigenous groups, such as the Aché of Paraguay, exemplified primitive communism, this did not apply to all indigenous groups, such as the Hiwi, using the example of the unequal distribution of meat from hunting. Singh asserts that many hunter gatherers, including the Andaman Islanders and Northern Paiute, recognized private ownership over land and trees, and claims that all hunter gatherers had private property, but provides examples that Marx and subsequent theorists label as personal property, not private property, such as personal "bows, arrows, axes and cooking implements".

The use of the term "communism" to describe these societies has been questioned when put in comparison with a future post-industrial communism, particularly in relation to the difference in scale from small communal groups to the size of modern nation-states.

=== Use of the term "primitive" ===
The term "primitive" in recent anthropological and social studies has begun to fall out of use due to racial stereotypes surrounding the ideas of what is primitive. Such a move has been supported by indigenous peoples who have faced racial stereotyping and violence due to being viewed as "primitive". Due to this, the term "primitive communism" may be replaced by terms such as Pre-Marxist communism.

Alain Testart and others have said that anthropologists should be careful when using research on current hunter-gatherer societies to determine the structure of societies in the paleolithic, where viewing current hunter-gatherer communities as "the most ancient of so-called primitive societies" is likely due to appearances and perceptions and does not reflect the progress and development that such societies have undergone in the past 10,000 years.

There have been Marxist historians criticised for their comments on the "primitivism" and "barbarism" of societies prior to their contact with European empires, such as the comments of Endre Sík. Such views on "primitivism" and "barbarism" are also prevalent in the works of their non-Marxist contemporaries. Marxist anthropologists have criticised and denounced Soviet anthropologists and historians for declaring indigenous communities they were studying for primitive communism as "degenerate".

== See also ==
Anthropology

- Classless society
- Ethnocentrism
- Functionalism (social sciences)
- Marxist anthropology
- Marxist archaeology
- Original affluent society
- Origins of society
- State of nature
- Structural functionalism
- Unilineal evolution

Economy

- Economic anthropology
- Economy of the Haudenosaunee
- Potlatch
- Primitive accumulation of capital
- Right to property
- Social ownership
- The Gift (essay)

Law

- Great Law of Peace
- Indigenous rights
- Res communis

Marxism

- Marx's theory of history
- Mode of production
- Pre-Marxist communism
