= Glinsk, County Mayo =

Glinsk Glinsce
- Townland
- Location in Ireland
- Coordinates: 54°18′29″N 9°36′38″W
- Country: Ireland
- Province: Connacht
- County: County Mayo
- Elevation: 304 m (997 ft)
- Irish Grid Reference: F948420

Glinsk (Irish: Glinsce, meaning 'glen of the brambles') is a townland in the County Mayo Gaeltacht in Ireland. It is in the parish of Kilcommon and barony of Erris. Glinsk Mountain (304 metres) is a remote area of upland blanket bog with sea cliffs descending to Broadhaven Bay and continuing along the coast to a height of 255 metres at Benwee Head. The mountain is the source of the Muingnabo River.

== Natural energy project proposal ==
There is a proposal to build a 480 megawatt combined wind farm-hydroelectric facility at this location which could contribute towards the county's goal of becoming self-sufficient in energy supply. The project would use wind turbines to pump sea water up to energy storage in the form of reservoirs on Glinsk Mountain. When required, the reservoirs would feed power generating turbines by allowing the water to fall down a shaft back to the ocean.

== Pictures ==
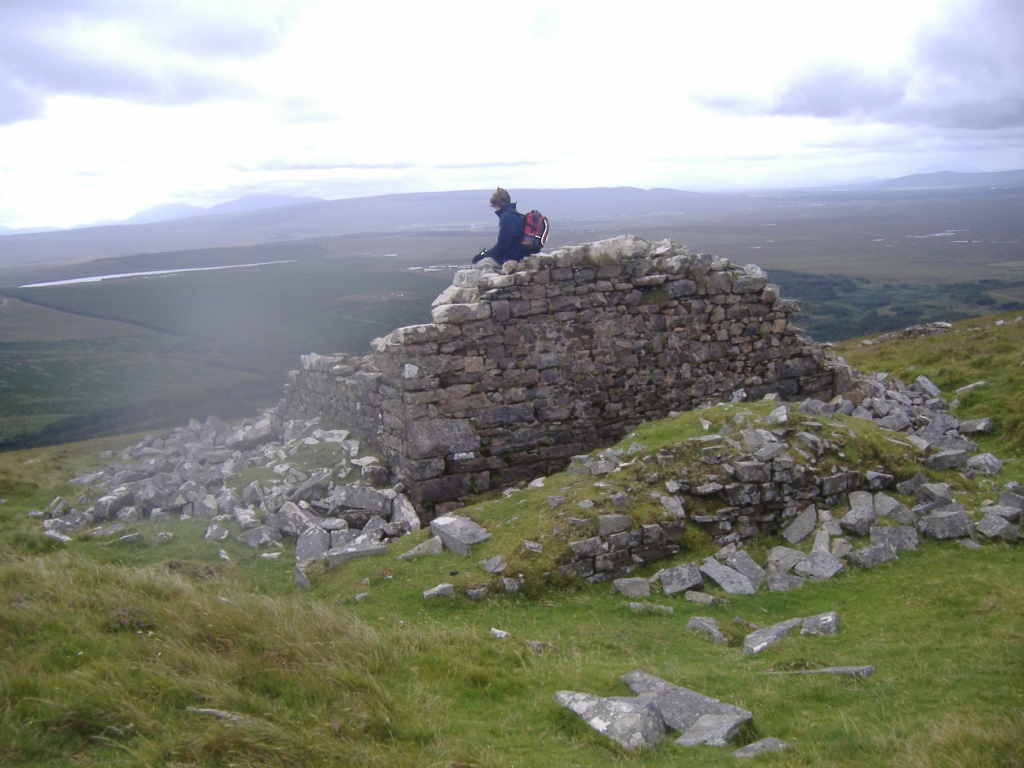
Watch tower on Glinsk Mountain built after the Irish Rebellion of 1798

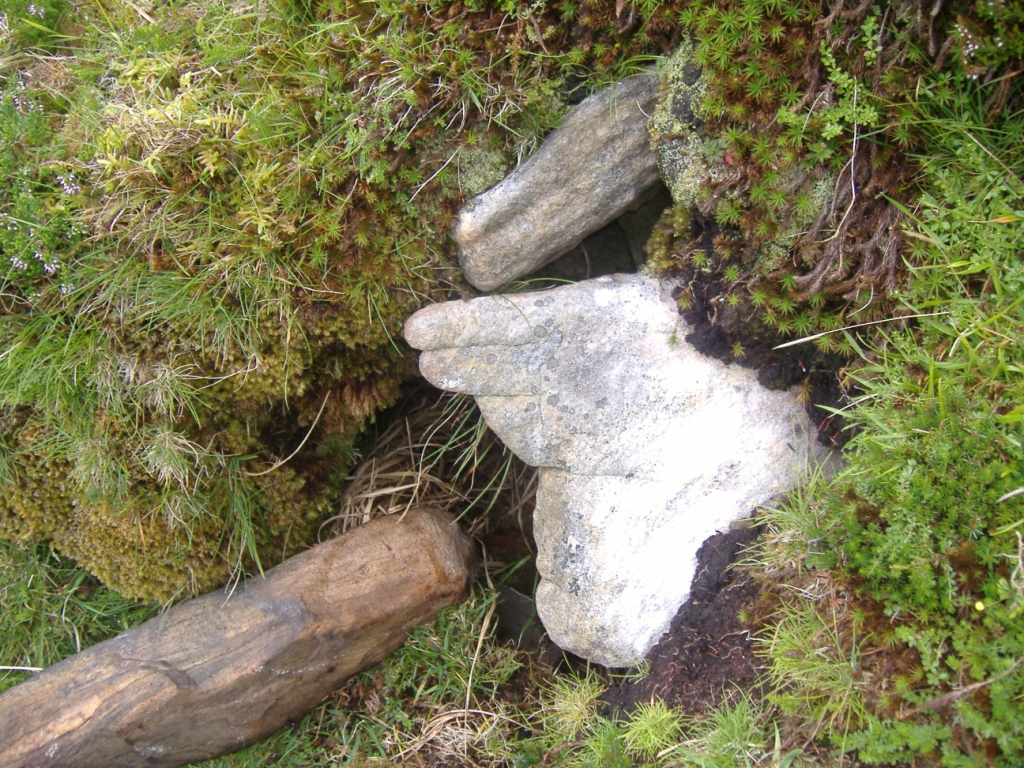
Blanket bog on Glinsk Mountain

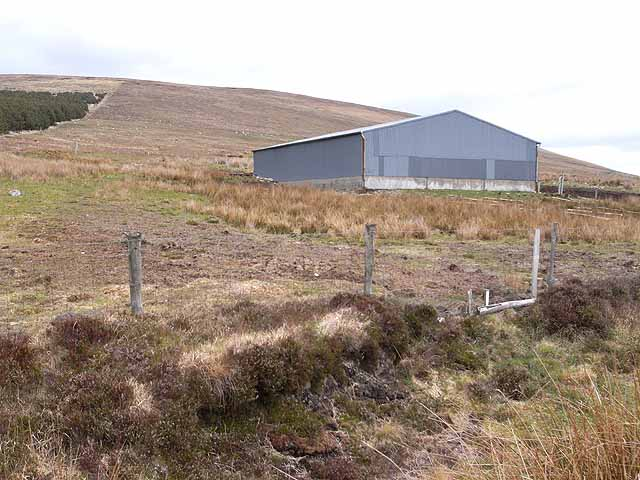
Base of Glinsk Mountain
