= Pullathomas =

Village in County Mayo, Ireland

Pullathomas Poll an tSómais Kilcommon / Pollatomais / Pollatomish / Pollathomas
- Village
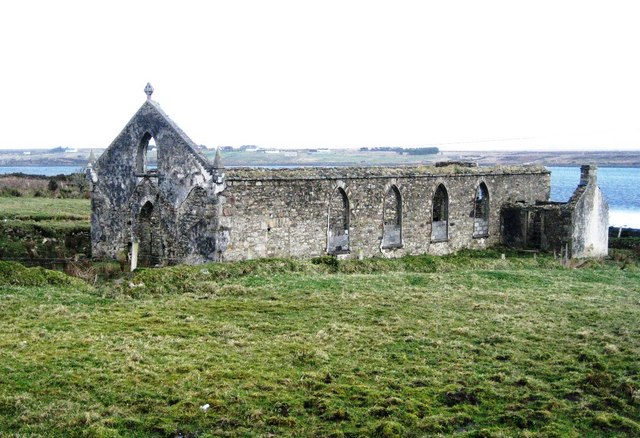
- Ruined church near Pullathomas

- Location in Ireland
- Coordinates: 54°14′57″N 9°48′40″W
- Country: Ireland
- Province: Connacht
- County: County Mayo

Area
  - Townland: 2.77 km^{2} (1.07 sq mi)
- Elevation: 49 m (161 ft)

Population (2011)
  - Total: 100
- Poll an tSómais is the only official name. The anglicised spelling Pollatomish and English name Pullathomas have no official status.

Pullathomas (Irish: Poll an tSómais; also known as Kilcommon, Pollatomais, Pollatomish and Pollathomas, meaning "hollow of comfort") is a Gaeltacht village and townland in northwest County Mayo, Ireland. In the barony of Erris and parish of Kilcommon, it lies close to the mouth of Broadhaven Bay next to Sruwaddacon Bay. Pullathomas townland has an area of approximately 685.6 acres (2.8 km^{2}) and, as of 2011, had a population of 100 people.

== History ==
=== Early history ===
The townland is also called Kilcommon named for Saint Coman. The area is recorded in the Annals of the Four Masters.

In 1585, the Protestant Bishop of Killala is recorded to have owned the townland. In 1636, Michael Cormuck of Inver Castle leased Pullathomas from the Protestant Bishop. By 1770, the O'Donel family had taken over the lease of Pullathomas.

A community of Augustinian friars once resided here but were later expelled. In the 1770s, the O'Donels built Kilcommon Lodge, which became a residence for Catholic clergy.

=== 19th century ===
The Society of Friends provided aid to people in Pullathomas during the famines of the early 19th century.

In 1847 Kilcommon Lodge was attacked by people seeking food.

Protestant proselytisation was attempted with chapels constructed. Pullathomas was connected by a road to Inver in 1842.

=== Later history ===
A Protestant schoolhouse, Ivy Cottage, used as a military camp for anti-treaty forces during the Irish Civil War was later burnt by pro-treaty forces.

The area around Dooncarton Mountain experienced intense rainfall causing a series of 30 peat landslides between Pullathomas and Glengad on 19 September 2003, causing damages amounting to €620,000. A corner of the old graveyard was struck, sweeping graves into the sea. Several million euros were spent in repairs.

== Geography ==
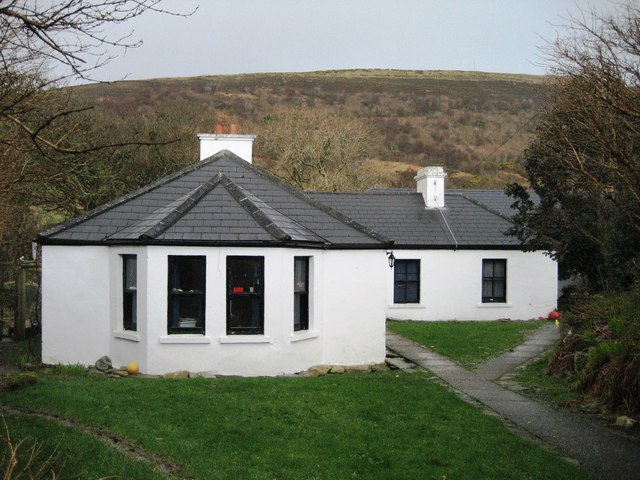
Kilcommon Lodge, Pullathomas

=== Pollatomish Bog NHA ===
Pollatomish Bog is a designated Natural Heritage Area of protected low-lying blanket bog about 7 km south of the village. Grasses and sedges dominate the lower northern slopes with species like Cottongrasses recorded.

== See also ==
- List of towns and villages in the Republic of Ireland
