= Porturlin =

Village in County Mayo, Ireland

Porturlin Port Durlainne
- Village
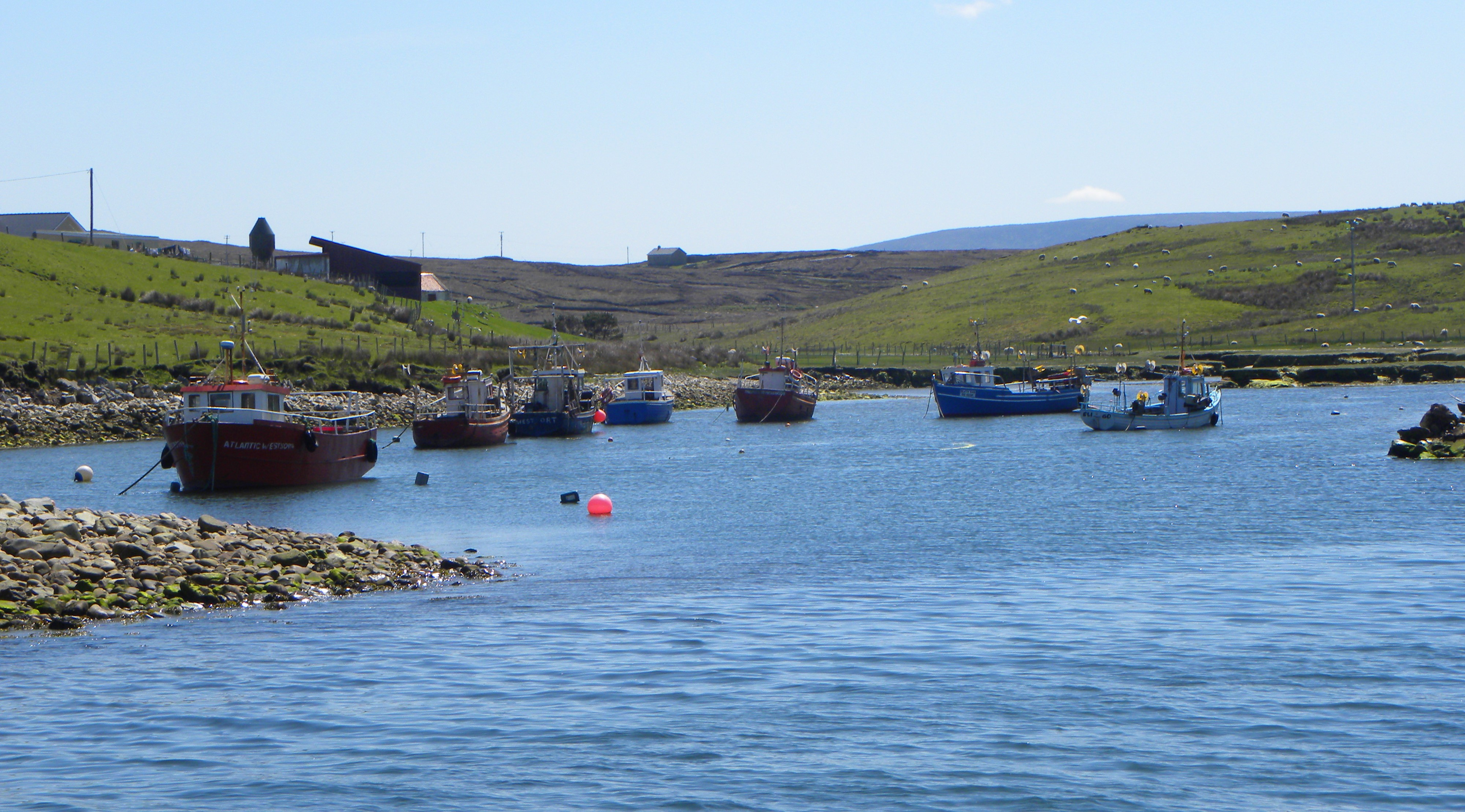
- Fishing vessels at Porturlin

- Location in Ireland
- Coordinates: 54°18′58″N 9°42′54″W
- Country: Ireland
- Province: Connacht
- County: County Mayo

Area
  - Total: 9.152 km^{2} (3.534 sq mi)
- Elevation: 33 m (108 ft)
- Highest elevation (Porturlin Hill): 155 m (509 ft)

Population (2011)
  - Total: 59
  - Density: 6.4/km^{2} (17/sq mi)
- Time zone: UTC+0 (WET)
  - Summer (DST): UTC-1 (IST (WEST))
- Irish Grid Reference: F 88463 42160
- As this is a Gaeltacht village Port Durlainne is the only official name. The anglicised spelling Porturlin has no official status.

Porturlin (Irish: Port Durlainne) is a Gaeltacht village and townland on the northwest coast of County Mayo, Ireland. It is situated in the barony of Erris and parish of Kilcommon. Porturlin townland has an area of approximately 2261.5 acres (9.1 km^{2}) and, as of 2011, had a population of 59 people.

== History ==
Following the Irish Rebellion of 1798 watch towers and defence structures were built along the northern coast. A road was constructed to the area in the 1840s.

=== Industry ===
In 1894, the Congested Districts Board set up a processing facility for herring and mackerel in Porturlin, they also operated a lace school in the area.

After several iterations, in 1965, Mayo County Council started to construct a fishing pier for use by a greater number of vessels.

== Geography ==
Richard Webb, present during the famine years to assess the situation for the Society of Friends, noted that the prime fishing area in Mayo was located off Porturlin, but described the area as almost inaccessible by land.

== See also ==
- British rule in Ireland
- Economy of the Republic of Ireland
- List of towns and villages in the Republic of Ireland
