= Inver, County Mayo =

Village in County Mayo, Ireland

Inver An tInbhear
- Village
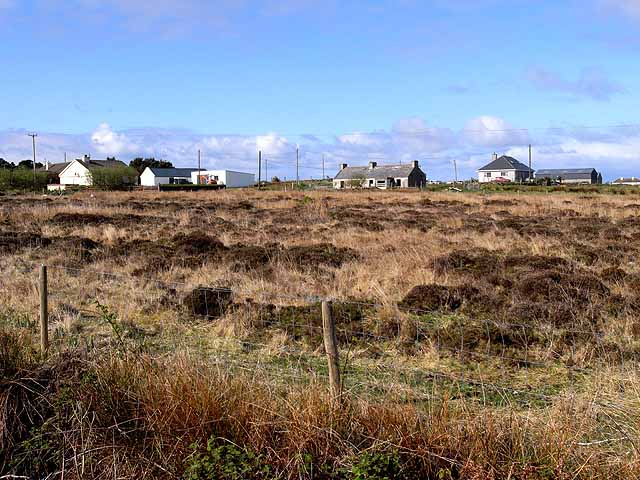
- Inver village

- Location in Ireland
- Coordinates: 54°14′59″N 9°52′04″W
- Country: Ireland
- Province: Connacht
- County: County Mayo

Area
  - Total: 2.7180 km^{2} (1.0494 sq mi)
- Elevation: 20 m (66 ft)

Population (2011)
  - Total: 114
  - Density: 41.9/km^{2} (109/sq mi)
- Time zone: UTC+0 (WET)
  - Summer (DST): UTC-1 (IST (WEST))
- Irish Grid Reference: F 78508 35031
- As this is a Gaeltacht village An tInbhear is the only official name. The anglicised spelling Inver has no official status.

Inver (Irish: An tInbhear) is a Gaeltacht village and townland in northwest County Mayo, Ireland. It is situated in the barony of Erris and civil parish of Kilcommon, bordering Broadhaven Bay. Inver townland has an area of approximately 671.6 acres (2.7 km^{2}) and, as of 2011, had a population of 114 people.

In an 1812 map by William Bald the houses in this townland were located along a river, on the coast of Broadhaven Bay. The townland was once divided, and presently homes are found in areas such as Caoldubh.

== History ==
Population census
Year	Pop.	±% p.a.
1841	430	—
1851	235	−5.86%
1911	173	−0.51%
2011	114	−0.42%

=== Early history ===
Archaeological evidence indicates that this townland was inhabited during prehistoric times. In 1835, Samuel Lewis described it as having a "druidical altar".

=== Inver Castle ===
The Record of Monuments and Places records a castle in Inver. The castle, which later fell into disrepair, was a possession of the Clan Barrett. By 1655, the Cormucks, a family from Munster, gained the castle after the Barretts had revolted. In 1680, it was acquired by Sir James Shaen.

A survey, conducted in 1802 noted Inver castle as once 'the principal castle in all Erris.' The Congested Districts Board purchased the townland and the castle ruins around 1920, distributing it among tenants.

=== Spanish Armada ===
In 1588, the "Santiago," a ship of the Spanish Armada wrecked off the coast of Inver. The ship was carrying eighteen men and an Irish bishop. The crew abandoned the Santiago and joined another Spanish ship, which was later wrecked off the coast off Donegal.

Spanish vessels frequently used Broadhaven Bay as a harbour, exchanging goods for information to ensure safe travels further north.

In 1626, Dutch diver Jacob Johnsen was hired by the British Admiralty to salvage guns from Armada wrecks in Ireland, he faced hostility from Michael Cormuck of Inver Castle and suspected him of hiding the guns as part of a conspiracy. Johnsen initiated legal action, and by 1649, the case was dismissed after writing to cease proceedings.

=== Shipwrecks ===
In 1839 the "John and Marion Crystal," was driven onto the rocks at Inver by a storm, with five crewmen killed. The ship was plundered by locals. In the winter of 1893, the "River Nithe," similarly was wrecked on the coast. Several other wrecks have been documented.

=== Later history ===
During the Public Works for distress in 1846, the road from Barnatra to Inver and from Inver to Graughill was constructed, later a landing slip was built.

A fishing station for curing and smoking fish was established in the early 20th century.

== Religion ==
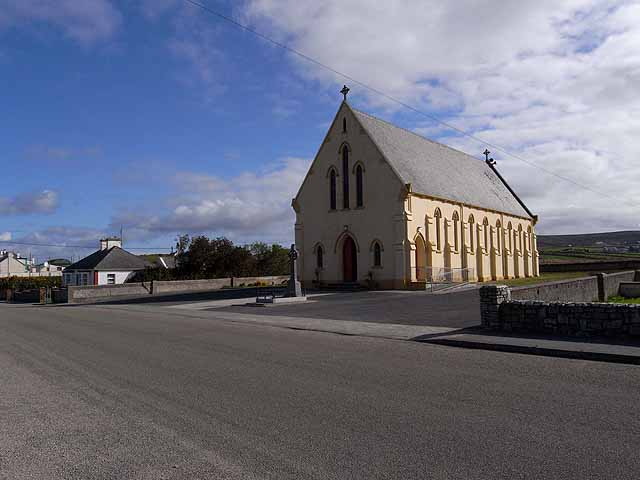
St Patrick's Catholic Church opened in Inver in 1936

Saint Patrick's Church, completed in 1936, is the local Catholic church and is one of five churches within Kilcommon Erris parish in the Roman Catholic Diocese of Killala. The church contains a jewel-like stained glass window attributable to Earley Studios Limited in Dublin.

== Amenities ==
A former vocational school, built in 1958, is now used as a community centre. A cemetery opened in 1969.

== Notable people ==
In 1648 the oracle Brian Rua U'Cearbhain was born in Inver in Falrua.

== See also ==
- List of towns and villages in County Mayo
- Townlands of Kilcommon
