= Bellacorick =

Townland in County Mayo, Ireland

Coordinates: 54°07′N 9°35′W

Bellacorick or Bellacoric (Irish: Béal Átha Chomhraic, meaning 'ford mouth of the confluence') is a townland in County Mayo in Ireland. It is in the Electoral Division of Glenco, in Civil Parish of Kilcommon, in the Barony of Erris, in the County of Mayo. Bellacorick has an area of: 2,789,440 m^{2} / 278.94 hectares / 2.7894 km^{2}. Bellacorick borders the following other townlands: Killsallagh to the west; Moneynierin to the east; Muingaghel to the south; Srahnakilly to the north.

During the second half of the twentieth century, it had a large turf-fired power station.

== History ==
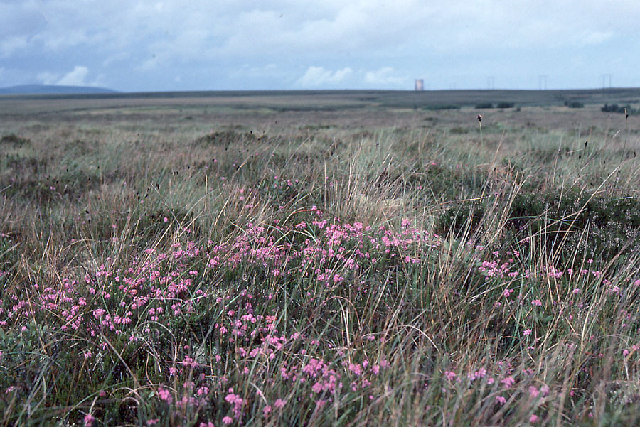
Moorland near Bellacorick

In about 1820, the civil engineer, William Bald, who was mapping the area and building roads through Erris, designed the Bellacorick Bridge, known as the Musical Bridge, it can be 'played' in two different ways:

- The first way is by rolling a stone along the parapet on either side. As the stone drops along musical notes are produced in rapid succession.
- The second method is to hold the stone in your hand and to strike it on the slabs which form the coping of the parapet hitting each slab as you go along and drawing back the hand immediately after striking. Each slab gives forth its own peculiar note and a musical scale is produced.

The bridge was difficult to erect. Because of the remarkable soundness of the earth the foundation had to be secured by timber. It has four elliptical arches each thirty feet apart, with battlements nearly 400 feet (120 m) long. The Erris prophet Brian Rua U'Cearbhain referred to the then unbuilt bridge at Bellacorick in the 17th century. He said that it would never be finished and it never has been.

The spring of 1920, the RIC police station was captured and burned by a group of IRA volunteers from Crossmolina.

== Energy generation ==
=== Peat-fired power station ===
Peat has been Ireland's staple fuel for centuries and still provides about 12% of the nation's energy needs. In June 1949, James Kilroy TD, representing Erris, requested the government to build a turf fired power station for the generation of electricity in Erris. He also pointed out the advantage of reclaiming the bog and introducing a scheme of afforestation. The ESB acquired five and a half acres, two hundred metres from the bridge as the site for the power station. The access road was built over the ruins of the old shooting lodge. At the same time Bord na Mona bought 20,000 acres (81 km^{2}) of bogland. They harvested the turf to feed the power station. The peat was pulverised and dried in the summer. It was stored on the bog in large polythene-covered piles. It was then taken to the station by railway wagons pulled by diesel locomotives.

==== Closure ====
In 2007 the massive chimney at Bellacorick was demolished for safety reasons. Even those who would have been opposed to the fossil-fuel burning power station on environmental and greenhouse gas grounds were sad to see the chimney demolished as it had become a well-known landmark for those returning home to Erris.

=== Wind farm ===
Since 1992 Ireland's first commercial wind farm has been operating at Bellacorick. The wind farm comprised 21 wind turbines with a total installed capacity of 6.45 megawatts and produces enough electricity to supply 4,500 households.

The North Mayo area had long been identified as perhaps the best wind farm site in the country. All the key criteria for a successful wind farm project were satisfied at Bellacorick. The mean annual wind speed at the site at a height of 30 metres is 7.28 m/s. The prevailing wind direction is south-westerly and the wind blows from the south-west 50% of the time. The wind regime is strong, steady winds. The ground is flat with an open aspect to the prevailing winds, resulting in virtually no loss or turbulence due to topographical features. The nearby thermal power station is linked to the National Electricity Grid. The Bellacorick wind farm is owned and operated by Renewable Energy Ireland, whose major shareholder is Bord na Mona. The environmental benefits of the wind farm can be stated in terms of environmental impacts avoided through not having to generate electricity from fossil fuel sources – coal, peat, oil and gas. Bellacorick wind farm avoids the production of 120 tonnes of sulphur dioxide, 85 tonnes of nitrous oxides and 20,000 tonnes of carbon dioxide in a year.

On 16 February 2011, Capital Approval for the 400 kV Grid West Electricity Transmission Scheme (Grid West) was granted by the EirGrid Board. The project is driven by the need to connect 646.5 MW of Gate 3 wind generation at Bellacorick. As of 2016, the project is awaiting consideration.

== Transport ==
Bus Éireann route 446 links Bellacorick with Crossmolina and Ballina. In the reverse direction it links to Bangor Erris, Belmullet and locations on the Mullet Peninsula. There is one service a day in each direction, including Sundays. On Friday evenings an extra journey operates from Ballina. Onward rail and bus connections are available at Ballina.
