= Portacloy =

Village in County Mayo, Ireland

Portacloy Port an Chlóidh
- Village
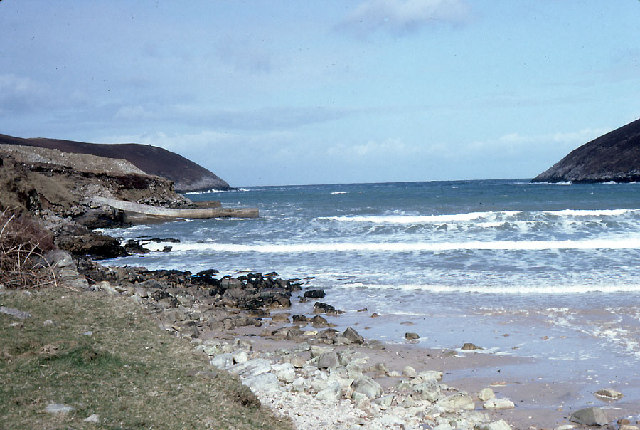
- Portacloy Bay

- Location in Ireland
- Coordinates: 54°19′51″N 9°47′00″W
- Country: Ireland
- Province: Connacht
- County: County Mayo

Area
  - Land: 4.0277 km^{2} (1.5551 sq mi)

Population (2011)
  - Total: 28
  - Density: 7.0/km^{2} (18/sq mi)
- Port an Chlóidh is the only official name. The anglicised spelling Portacloy has no official status.

Portacloy (Irish: Port an Chlóidh) is a Gaeltacht village and townland in northwest County Mayo, Ireland. In the barony of Erris and parish of Kilcommon, it is on the north of the Dún Chaocháin peninsula. The townland is on a horseshoe-shaped bay with two piers and several cliff walks. Portacloy townland has an area of approximately 995.3 acres (4.0277 km^{2}) and, as of 2011, had a population of 28.

== History ==
An area known as "Clayport" at the eastern side of Portacloy began supplying clay for earthenware in 1812. The 1838 Ordnance Survey map showed an old mill, coastguard station and boathouse at the site of this area.

Roads from Portacloy to Curraunboy and Glenamoy were completed in 1847. These were built as part of relief efforts during the Great Famine to provide employment in the form of public works.

The Society of Friends, noted the challenges faced in fishing due to severe weather and the lack of secure landing ports in the Portacloy area. Efforts in the 1880s aimed at securing a pier for Portacloy were met with resistance, citing limited resources for construction and an exposed setting.

The Congested Districts Board constructed a boat slip, breakwater, landing place, and approach road at Portacloy. Later developments included a bridge and a pier built in the 1960s. Telephone lines extended to Portacloy during World War II for defence purposes. The lines ceased post-war and were later made operational.

A look-out post was built in Portacloy during World War II on a headland near the bay. Officially named ‘LOP63’, it was one of 83 posts on the coast of Ireland administered by the Coast Watching Service. The post tracked several incursions into Irish waters during the Battle of the Atlantic. Nearby a large stone ground sign ‘ÉIRE 63’ was also erected, to let pilots know they were flying over Ireland, a neutral state. The look-out post was destroyed in a storm in October 2014 and was later restored.

== Geography ==
Benwee Head sits just beyond the entrance of the harbour. Charles Browne in an ethnographic study in 1893 described the terrain as rugged, primarily composed of marshland and mountain. The weather was described as being temperate with rare and short-lived frost or snow, yet with heavy rains persisting almost constantly for most of the year, accompanied by frequent and intense storms. Despite the flourishing vegetation, Browne found that trees were sparse due to relentless storms, only growing in sheltered areas.

Portacloy Bay was a Green Coast Award Beach for 2017 and is the starting and finishing point for an 18 km long loop walk.

== See also ==
- List of towns and villages in the Republic of Ireland
