= Carrowteige =

Village in County Mayo, Ireland

Ceathrú Thaidhg
- Village
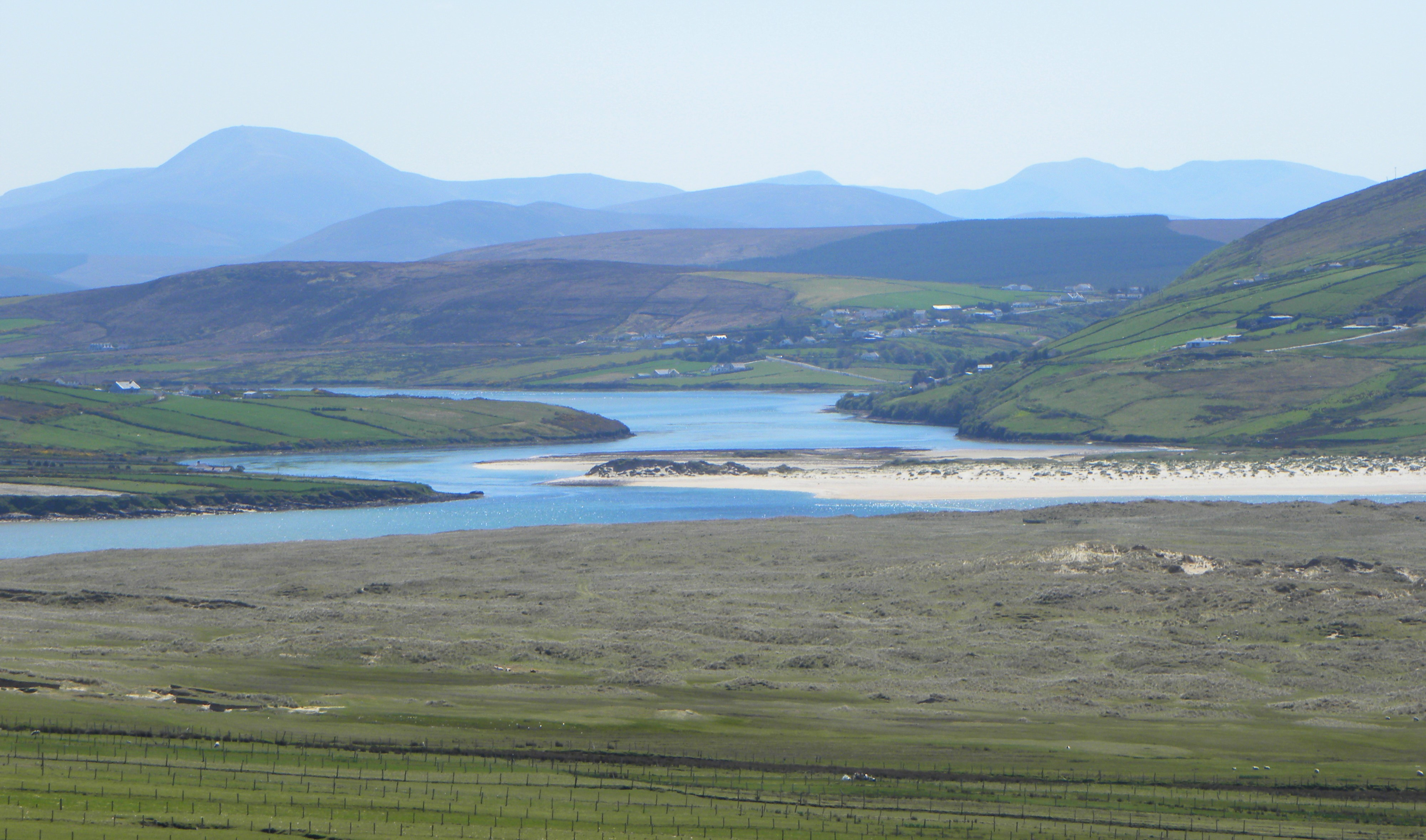
- Landscape of Carrowteige area

- Location in Ireland
- Coordinates: 54°18′50″N 9°49′01″W
- Country: Ireland
- Province: Connacht
- County: County Mayo
- Elevation: 91 m (299 ft)
- Irish Grid Reference: F818421
- Ceathrú Thaidhg is the only official name. The anglicized spelling Carrowteige has no official status.

Ceathrú Thaidhg (anglicized as Carrowteige) is a Gaeltacht village and townland on the Dún Chaocháin peninsula in northwestern County Mayo, Ireland. It is within Kilcommon (Cill Chomáin) parish in the barony of Erris. Carrowteige is a relatively small townland with an acreage of just 403 acres (1.63 km^{2}).

== History ==
Caochán, after whom the peninsula is named, was a legendary giant of Celtic sagas who had only one eye. His image was represented on the slopes of the hills overlooking Sruwaddacon Bay when the Tír Saile was created during the 1990s.

In 1841, a road was approved to run from Glenamoy to Carrowteige. In 1842 the drains for the road were partially opened, but by 1845 the road was still far from completed. Eventually in 1846, it was declared completed. There were no bridges on the road. At Muingnabo, the river bed was paved at a ford and remained that way until 1886 when the Annie Brady Bridge was erected. Annie Brady had been the wife of the Inspector of Fisheries for the area and had witnessed the difficulty in crossing the ford, and so raised money to build a bridge at the site. In 1933, a flood carried away the Annie Brady Bridge but it was later replaced.

Throughout Erris until about 1900, the custom was 'in most cottages, the family lived and slept in one room using the others as store rooms. they knew no other kind of house life. In this one room the family retired to sleep, only partially undressed. Often the only furniture in the room was a chair, a couple of small wooden stools, with a cooking pot, a kettle and a tea pot and some cups'. The biggest industry was that of lace schools. The Department of Lands and Fisheries took over the lace schools from The Congested Districts Board about 1923 and formed Gaeltarra Éireann, a semi-state body, to manage them but the lace school in Carrowteige was closed in 1976. Sewing and knitting industry gave most of the employment in both factories and homes over the years.

A Catholic church, the Church of the Immaculate Conception, was built and opened in 1972. Mass here is said in the Irish language.

== Cliff walks ==
There are several looped cliff walks which start and end at Carrowteige village. The walks overlook Broadhaven Bay and the Atlantic Ocean. They take walkers past some of the Tír Saile sculpture trail.

== See also ==
- Connacht Irish
- List of towns and villages in Ireland
