= Kiltane =

Parish in County Mayo, Ireland

Kiltane (Irish: Cill tSéadhna) is a parish in Erris, North County Mayo, Ireland.
