= Brian Rua U'Cearbhain =

17th century prophet from Ireland

Brian Rua (c.1648–?) was 17th century "prophet" or oracle from Erris in County Mayo, Ireland. Papers relating to the life and prophecies of Brian Rua, known collectively as Tarngaireacht Bhriain Ruaidh, were destroyed, apparently by his own son, who lost his temper with his father when the two had one of their regular disagreements.

Brian Rua lived in the parish of Kilcommon in the townland of Inver. Believed to have been born around the year 1648, his story was passed on through oral history in the parish. Brian Rua is reputed to have made a number of prophecies in his lifetime, predicting that "Carriages travelling North and South will have iron wheels and the stones on the roads will be talking" and "The day will come when fire carriages with iron wheels will bring death". In 1894, the first train on the newly created Achill railway line carried the bodies of 32 young people who died in a drowning tragedy in Clew Bay, an event locals suggest fulfilled the prophecy.

In 1906, Michael Timoney, a Celtic scholar from Lahardane, set out to document the story of Brian Rua. The stories were carried down the generations in the Irish language, and in 2000, as part of the Millennium Project, the story was translated into English and published as part of the book Traditional Cures and Gifted People by Philomena Cronin.
