= Broadhaven Bay =

Bay in County Mayo, Ireland

- Cnocán na Líne (Irish)
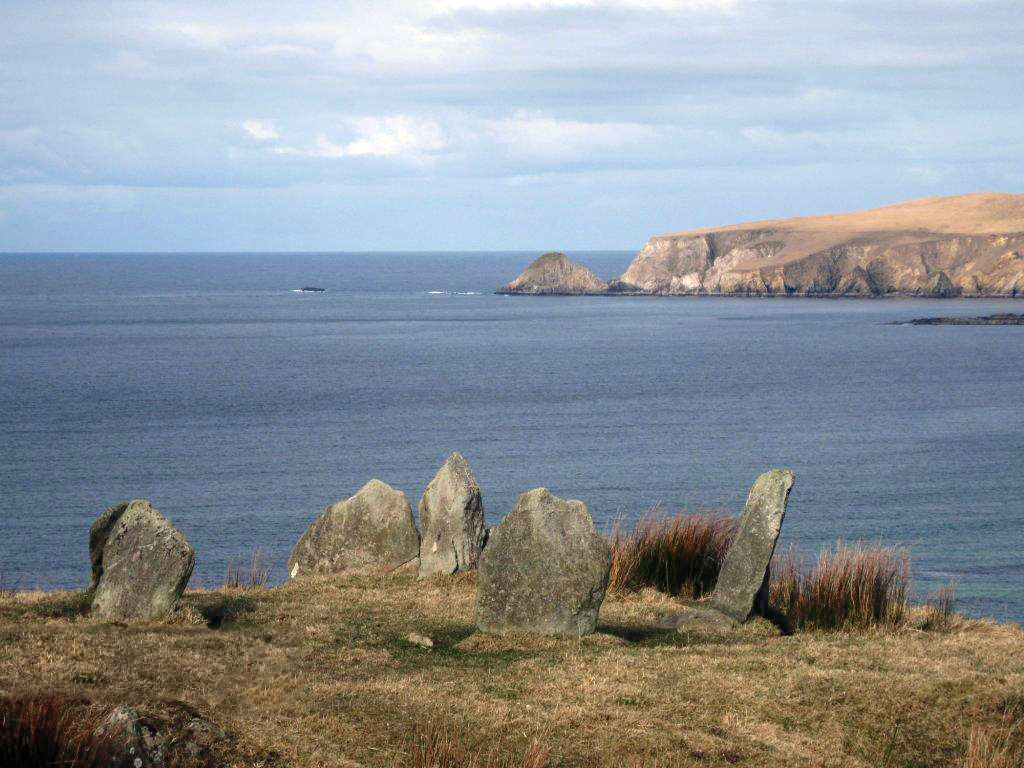
- Stone circle at Glengad overlooking bay

- Bay location in Ireland
- Location: County Mayo, Ireland
- Coordinates: 54°17′17″N 9°53′38″W
- Ocean/sea sources: Atlantic Ocean
- Max. width: 8.6 km (5.3 mi)

Ramsar Wetland
- Official name: Blacksod Bay and Broadhaven
- Designated: 7 June 1996
- Reference no.: 844

Broadhaven Bay (Irish: Cnocán na Líne) is a natural bay of the Atlantic Ocean on the northwestern coast of County Mayo, Ireland. The opening of the bay faces northward, stretching 8.6 km between Erris Head in the west and Kid Island/Oileán Mionnán in the east.

It borders the parishes of Kilcommon, Kiltane and Kilmore Erris in the Barony of Erris. Landscape largely consists of Atlantic blanket bog interspersed with some areas of machair and white sandy beaches. Population is relatively low, mainly concentrated around inlets along the coastline.

== Special Area of Conservation ==
Broadhaven Bay was designated by the National Parks and Wildlife Service, NPWS, as a candidate Special Area of Conservation (cSAC) in 2000. This designation concerns:

1. The presence of four key marine/coastal habitat types that are listed in Annex I of the EU Council Directive on the Conservation of Natural Habitats and of Fauna and Flora (Habitats Directive: 92/43/EEC, 1982), including Atlantic salt marsh, tidal mudflats, reefs and large shallow bays;
2. The presence of a number of unusual marine communities and species, and;
3. The seasonal presence of wintering wildfowl and breeding terns (Sterna spp.).

Furthermore, the inner parts of Broadhaven Bay known as Sruwaddacon Bay is designated as a Special Protection Area (SPA) and, together with the nearby Glenamoy Bog complex SAC important for wintering wildfowl species, in particular for brent geese, which is Annex II listed under the EU Birds directive.

== History ==
During the Spanish Armada era in the 16th century, several of the Armada ships foundered in the waters of North Mayo. The Santiago went down in the bay and many ships through the years have met their end in these waters. There are many tales of fortunes of gold and valuables being stashed away by local pirates after looting unfortunate ships which tried to take shelter from rough seas. See Brian Rua U'Cearbhain

== Broadhaven Lighthouse ==
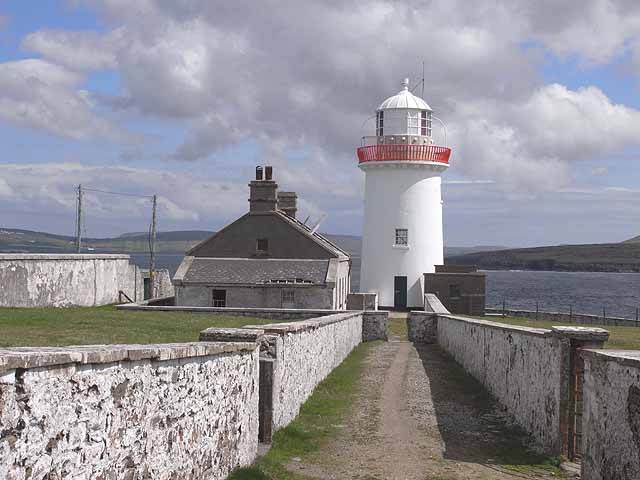
The lighthouse in 2010

In the north western mouth of Broadhaven Bay stands Broadhaven Lighthouse which guides boats through the bay in more recent times. The lifeboat for the area is stationed at Ballyglass pier.

There are many wonderful white sandy beaches all around the bay especially at Carrowteige/Rinroe, Glengad and Inver.

== Wildlife ==
Cetaceans are afforded protection within the 200-mile Exclusive Fishery Zone limit of the Irish State under the 1976 Wildlife Act and a 1982 amendment to the Whale Fisheries Act. Marine mammal legislation also protects all cetaceans as Annex IV species (species of community interest in need of strict protection) under the European Habitats directive. Within this directive, there are five marine mammal species that are known to frequent Irish waters which are further listed as Annex II species (protected endangered and vulnerable animals), namely;

- Common bottlenose dolphin (Tursiops truncatus)
- Harbour porpoise (Phocoena phocoena)
- Gray seal (Halichoerus grypus)
- Harbour/common seal (Phoca vitulina vitulina)
- European otter (Lutra lutra)

All five species are found in the Broadhaven Bay catchment.

== Stags of Broadhaven ==
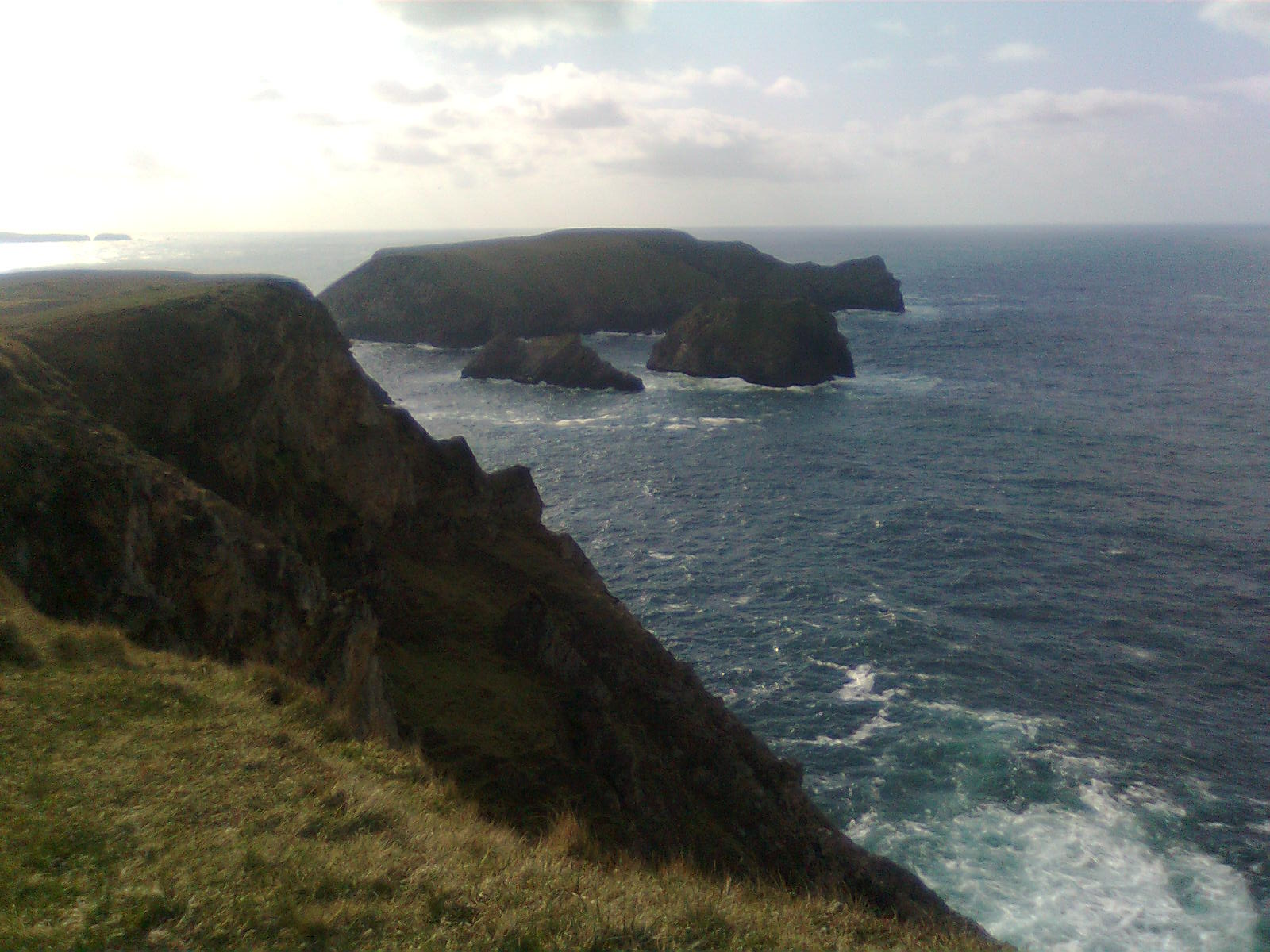
Kid Island, Broadhaven Bay, Erris, Co. Mayo

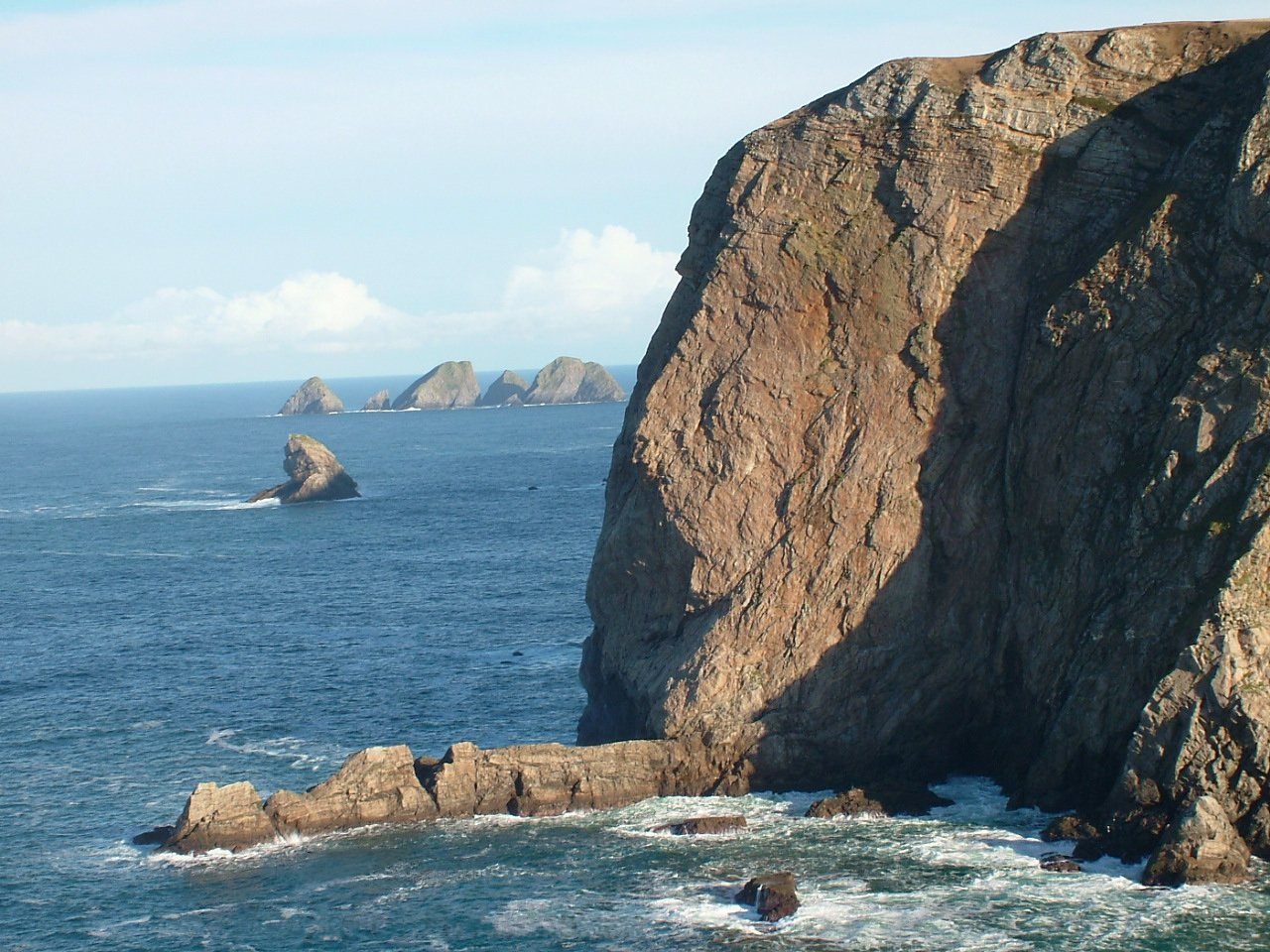
Benwee Head with the Stags of Broadhaven Bay, Kilcommon, Erris

The Stags of Broadhaven (Irish: Na Stácaí) are a group of five jagged rocky islands off the high cliffs of Benwee Head of Kilcommon parish. Although only just over a mile from the mainland, they lie outside County Mayo. The islands include the central island Teach Dónal Ó’Cléirigh, the highest. To the south lies An Teach Mór. To the east is An Teach Beag. The fourth island is The Stags NW of centre, Carraig na Faola, NW of centre and An t-Oighean (78m). They rise out of the sea rising steeply to over 100 metres above sea level. The islands support puffin, Storm & Leach’s petrels. One of the rocks is entirely bisected by a long narrow cave dramatically from one side to the other and they are a popular site for visiting divers, sub aqua teams, canoeists and adventurers. The Stags were formerly grazed for about six weeks every summer until the 1960s.

== Importance as a marine habitat ==
Broadhaven Bay is an important habitat for many marine mammals and other marine life as it incorporates several different coastal habitats ranging from exposed bedrock at the foot of the Benwee Head cliffs due to constant wave action to sheltered mud sediments at the upper end of the estuary of Sruth Fada Conn Bay.

Encompassed within an area that is relatively small, Broadhaven Bay and its inlet, Sruth Fada Conn Bay represent possibly the only known area in Ireland with all five Annex II (listed above in Wildlife) species present on a regular basis. The bay is species rich with 72 species counted.

In exposed areas of the bay regularly exposed to wave action the anemone Phellia gausapata is found in shallow waters A cave in deeper water supports colonies of the rare anemone Parazoanthus anguicomus and soft coral Alcyonium glomeratum.

In the outer bay zone beds of kelp thrive with foliose brown algaes and several varieties of the axinellid sponge species have colonised the reefs. Other communities tolerant of vertical or steeply sloped bedrock are thriving also.

A rare crab Pirimela denticulata and hydroid Tamarisca tamarisca both live in the bay. In the sublittoral zones of the bay lives the burrowing urchin Echinocardium cordatum whose hairy shells regularly turn up on the shores, seagrass Zostera marina and oysters Ostrea edulis.

Broadhaven Bay is of high conservation importance owing to the presence of several habitats that are listed on Annex 1 of the EU Habitats Directive. Large shallow bays, intertidal sand flats, reefs, marine caves, salt marshes are of ornithological importance for breeding and overwintering bird species.

In the inner bay of Sruth Fada Conn and other Broadhaven Bay inlets, there are extensive intertidal mudflats characterised by polychaetes and bivalve communities. Atlantic salt marshes fringe on the blanket bog in this area also and species include turf fucoids, sea thrift, sea arrowgrass, Sea Plantain, salt marsh grasses, rushes Juncus gerardii and Juncus maritimus.

Broadhaven Bay and its inlets support important numbers of breeding terns of several varieties and black-headed gulls. It is an important area for wintering waterfowl. The following species have nationally important populations in the area - red-breasted merganser, ringed plover, grey plover, sanderling, dunlin, bar-tailed godwit, brent goose, oystercatcher, Eurasian golden plover, lapwing, knot, curlew, common redshank and turnstone.

Taken overall, it serves to highlight the uniqueness of Broadhaven Bay and the waters of northwest Mayo. In comparison with other areas in Ireland where surveys have been carried out, Broadhaven provides a high marine mammal species diversity, with sightings of 10 out of the 24 marine mammal species currently recorded in Irish waters occurring in the area.

== Corrib Gas Project ==
Broadhaven Bay has in recent years (approx 2002–2014 and ongoing) been the site of the Corrib gas controversy where Royal Dutch Shell sent the Solitaire, reputedly the largest pipelaying ship in the world, into the bay to lay an offshore section of a pipeline to deliver gas from the Corrib gas discover.

A local fisherman, Pat O'Donnell, served five months in Castlerea prison (February/March/April 2010) for refusing to stop fishing the bay in order to allow the Corrib Gas Project to lay a high pressure, unodourised pipeline and umbilical through it. The proposed project was under examination by the country's planning appeals board, An Bord Pleanála, but has been overturned on each occasion. The third application from Royal Dutch Shell involved the boring of a tunnel some 4.2 metres diameter deep under the entire length of the bay. The proposed gas pipeline diameter is just 0.5 metres but required additional material around it. The developers stated that the proposed tunnel in the protected bay is in order for them to bring in all future fossil fuel finds by the same route.

== Notable people ==
Grace Devit - A local woman was reported to have lived to 122. She died in 1844 and claimed to have been born in 1722. She also claimed to have "never seen a tree, crossed a bridge, or left the Barony of Erris".

== See also ==
- Wild Atlantic Way
