= Kilcommon (County Mayo civil parish) =

Kilcommon Cill Chomáin
- Civil parish
- Location in Ireland
- Coordinates: 54°15′49″N 9°47′45″W
- Country: Ireland
- Province: Connacht
- County: County Mayo
- Irish Grid Reference: F820374

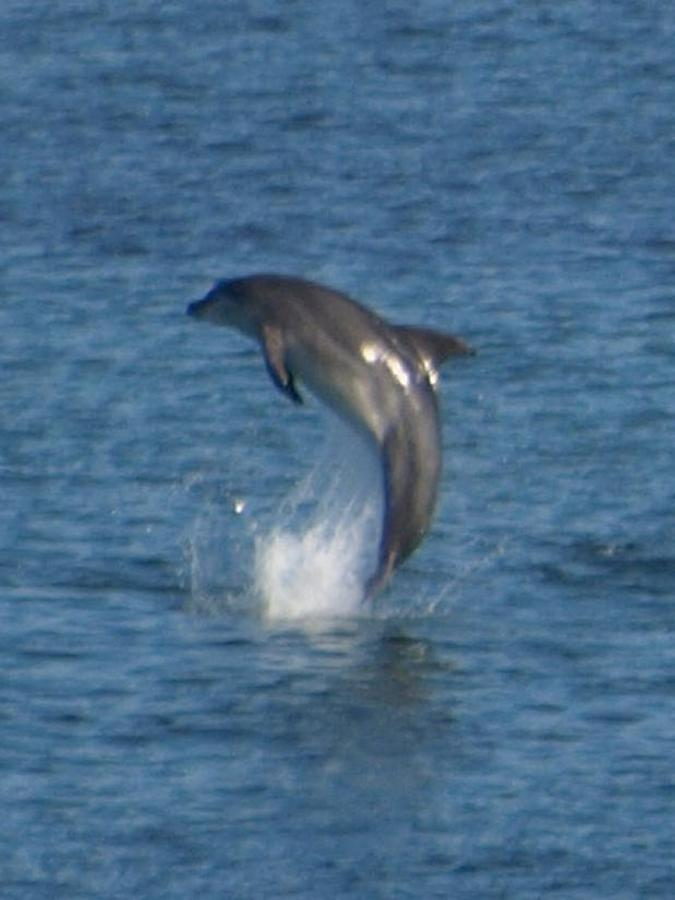
Dolphin frolicking with its pod in Sruwaddacon estuary, Broadhaven Bay, Erris, County Mayo, Ireland. August 2010

Kilcommon (Irish: Cill Chomáin) is a civil parish in the barony of Erris in north County Mayo, Ireland, consisting of two large peninsulas; Dún Chaocháin and Dún Chiortáin. It has 37 townlands, some of which are so remote that they have no inhabitants. Habitation is concentrated mainly along both sides of Sruwaddacon Bay which flows into Broadhaven Bay, in villages including Glengad, Pollathomas, Rossport, Inver and Carrowteige, and in the Glenamoy area further inland.

== History ==
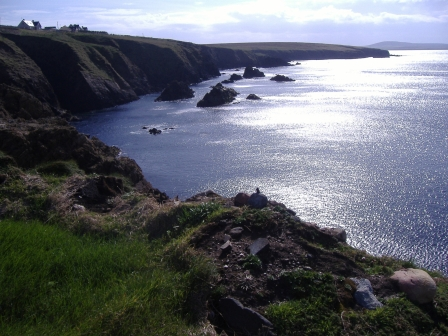
The view from Dún Chiortán promontory fort, Glengad, Kilcommon, Erris.

Kilcommon parish takes its name from St. Comán who lived around the end of the sixth century AD. The saint is allegedly buried in the old church yard at Pollatomais, near to the entrance where the walls of the old Church can still be seen. In the Ordnance Survey Letters of 1838 (O'Donovan), the writers says "of the old church itself only a part of one gable remains from which little can be learned of its style or age".

== Topography ==
Much of the Kilcommon landscape of elevated moorland, borders the Atlantic coast. It is a wild and rugged landscape with large tracts of blanket bog, tiny isolated villages, white sandy beaches and towering cliffs of Benwee Head which, for thousands of years has remained relatively unscathed by overdevelopment by successive generations of Kilcommon inhabitants. Farming is small scale non-intensive. Situated at the mouth of Broadhaven Bay, on its 21st century surface, Kilcommon is characterised by its scenery, huge towering cliffs and rugged sea stacks interspersed with miles of white sandy beaches, tranquil islands and vast tracts of blanket bog with its rare and fragile biodiversity. Unlike the west of Ireland landscape further south in Galway and Clare, there are few huge rocks randomly scattered across this landscape.

The blanket bog dominates the landscape changing its hues and texture in accordance with the seasons – sometimes fresh and brightest green, sometimes purple and gold and covered with billowing white bog cotton, and, in November and December, the wonderful rustic tones of golden orange/red species light up the winter landscape. At all times the bog is a living habitat for many species of insects, spiders and plants for whom this is the perfect habitat not found anywhere else. Grey fronted geese fly across on their way to their breeding grounds further north and it is possible to spot the corncrake and the rare red-necked phalarope whose only breeding ground left in Ireland is in this remote corner of the country.

== Geology ==
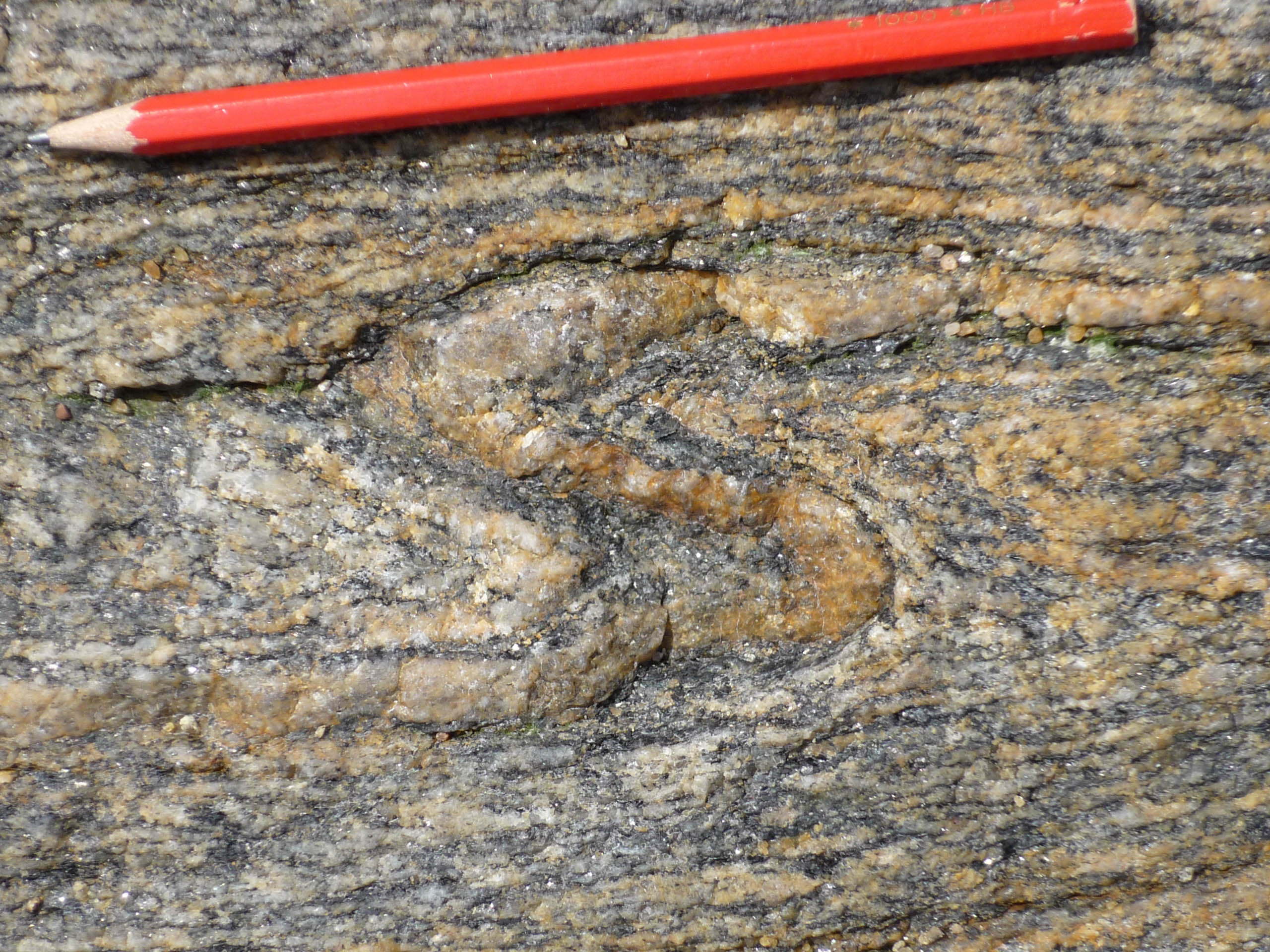
Gneiss

Kilcommon parish comprises a very ancient landscape of schist and pale creamy psammite along with some two billion year old pre-Cambrian pink striped gneisses. Boulders of snow white quartz which intruded into the bedrock from geological turmoil below, some 450 million years ago (Silurian period) are to be found in the western part of the parish. The bedrock, exposed when the blanket bog is cut away to provide fuel for the rural community here, demonstrate that this land has seen geomorphological turmoil over the last two billion years – periods of intense heat, intense cold, pressure and tectonic shifts which have moulded and remoulded the landscape into what it is today.

There are two main peninsulas in the parish - Dún Chiortáin and Dún Chaocháin. They are named for two 'giant' brothers who live on in the folklore of the area. They each had a Dún or a promontory fort and folktales relate that they shared kitchen utensils which they used to throw across Sruwaddacon Bay (Sruth Fhada Chonn - Bay of the Long Hound) which divided their territories.

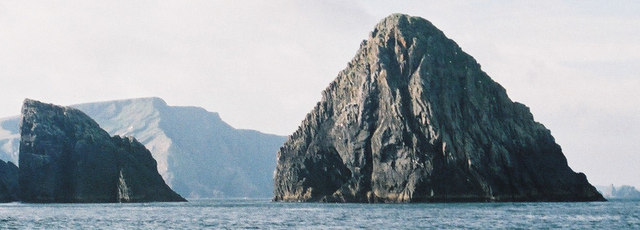
The Stags (or Stacks) of Broadhaven, Kilcommon Parish, Erris

Sea cliffs run along much of the coast from the 892-foot (272 m) high Benwee Head and along the north coastline to Glinsk mountain. The rocky islands known as The Stags, pictured below are to be seen off the North Kilcommon coastline.

== Archaeology ==
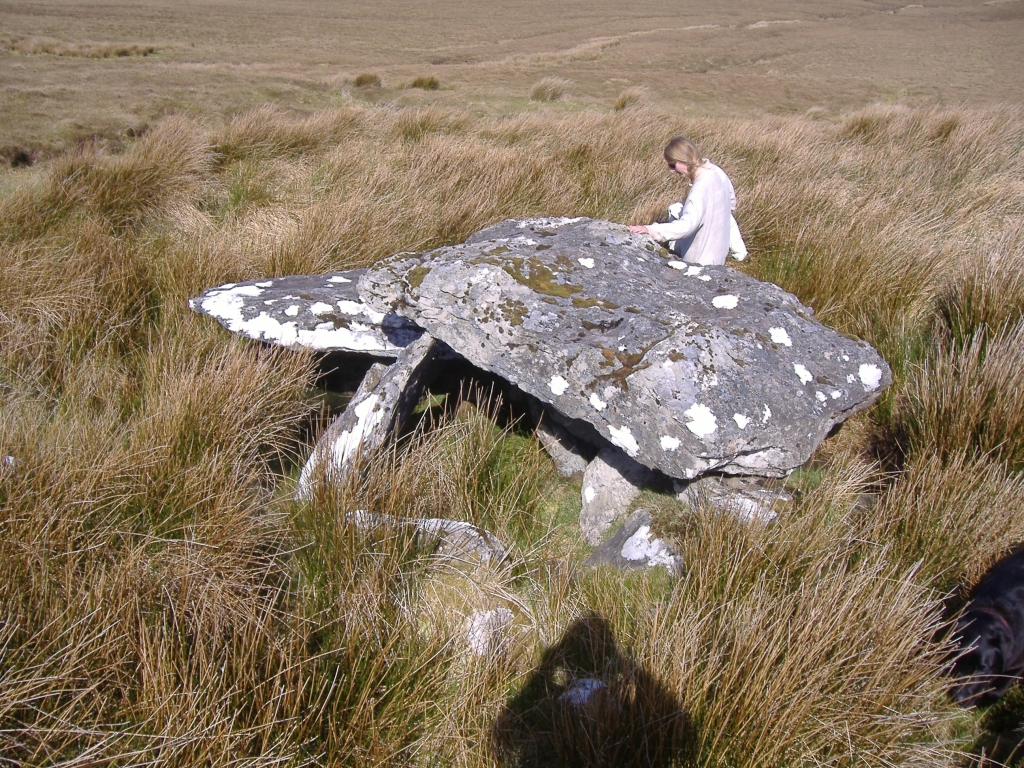
Unclassified megalith on northern slopes of Faulagh Mountain, Kilcommon parish, Erris

The fossilised remains of ancient Scots pine trees which were part of the ancient forests which covered most of inland Ireland after the retreat of the last Ice Age some 15,000 years ago are to be seen across the landscape, exposed by turf cutting in recent years. There are many archaeological remains throughout the parish also, mainly in the western portion as the land to the east was, and still remains to a great extent, inaccessible and uninhabited. The area has a very large number of megalithic tomb remains and most types of megalithic are represented although because there has been no money spent on archaeological investigation in this parish, the archaeological resource is little documented. In the eastern portion of the parish there is evidence of the presence of possible crannogs in lakes which point towards some habitation in the past. In recent times the growth of blanket bog, conifer forestry plantations and the absence of roads through the area, has made townlands such as Bunalty, Barrooskey, Baralty, Srahnaplaigh and Muingnabo difficult to access except by the most intrepid of explorers. In the western parts of the parish, archaeological remains stretching from the Mesolithic through Neolithic, Bronze Age, Iron Age, Early Christian, Plantations, to the current day are widely seen.

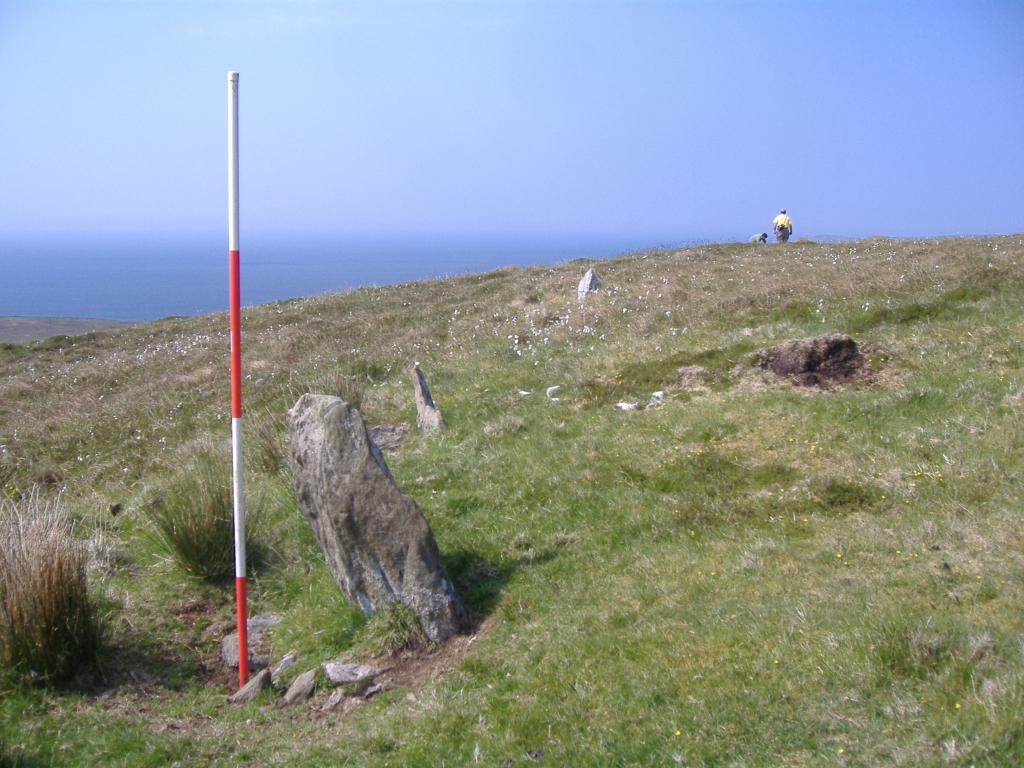
A series of ancient markers on Cnoc Nansai, Graughil

== Cliff walks - way-marked walks ==
There are several way-marked walks along the remote cliffs of Benwee Head in the north of the parish. Maps have been published by Comhar Dún Chaocháin Teo, Ceathrú Thaidhg as Dún Chaocháin Walks and Siúlóidí Iorrais.

== Gaeltacht ==
Much of Kilcommon (Cill Chomáin) parish is Irish speaking, and Catholic Mass is celebrated in Irish in Ceathrú Thaidhg in the far north of the parish. There is an Irish language summer school in Ceathrú Thaidhg. There are between 700 and 1,000 native Irish speakers in the parish.

== Churches ==
There are five Roman Catholic churches in the parish:

- Christ the King Church, Aughoose,
- St. Paul's Church, Glenamoy,
- St. Patrick's Church, Inver,
- Star of the Sea Church, Cornboy, and
- Séipéal Muire gan Smál, Ceathru Thaidhg

During the 18th century, at a time known as the Penal Times, the British government restricted the number and movement of Roman Catholic clergy. At that time the parish of Kilcommon comprised all of 'mainland' Erris (from Claggan, Ballycroy to Portacloy). That territorial name and boundary is still used for civil administration.

== Civil parishes and townlands ==
Kilcommon used to refer to almost all of Erris but it was so large that in the early 19th century, it was further divided into three districts - Ballycroy, Kilcommon West and Kilcommon East. In 1873 it was again reorganised and divided into four civil parishes - Kilmore, Ballycroy, Kiltane and Kilcommon which remain to this day. There are 37 townlands in the modern parish of Kilcommon.

== Corrib Gas ==
Since around the turn of the 21st century, Kilcommon parish has been affected by Corrib gas project, under the ownership of Royal Dutch Shell. After many years and many changes of proposed route for a high pressure raw gas pipeline running through the area many aspects of the proposed project have been strongly disputed. A refinery has been built 10 kilometres inland by Royal Dutch Shell that has no access to the proposed landfall site. There were several oral hearings held about this problem by An Bord Pleanála, and permission was subsequently granted. Works commenced in July 2011.

== Natural resources ==
Tidal power, hydroelectric schemes, and wind farms are amongst the alternative energy generation opportunities for which the area has potential.

== Notable people ==
- Brian Rua U'Cearbhain, 17th century prophet from Inbhear
- Willie Corduff, winner of the 2007 Goldman Environmental Prize
