= Erris =

Barony in County Mayo, Ireland

Erris Iorras
- Barony
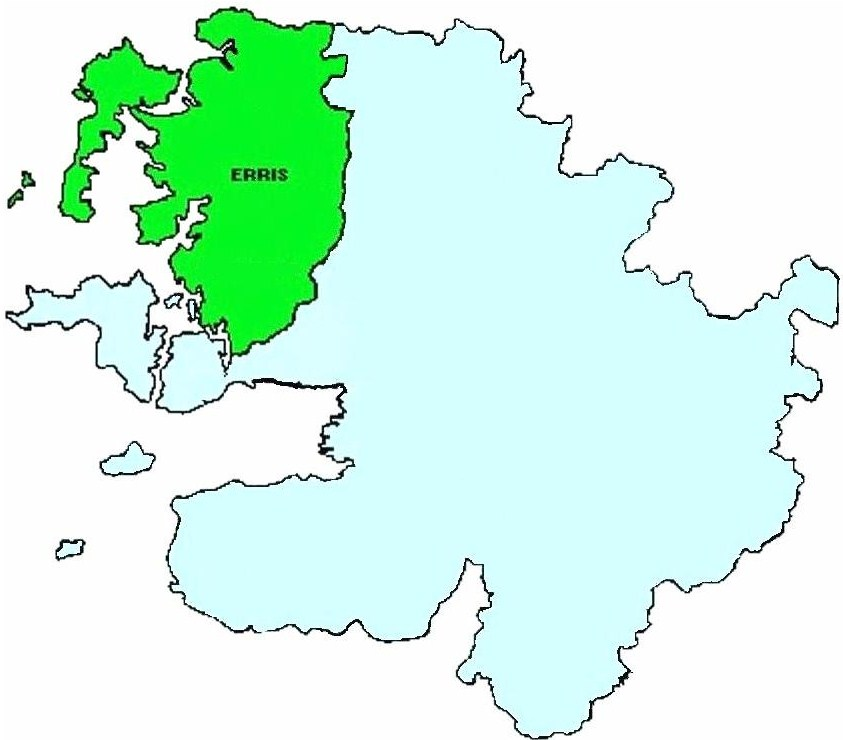
- Location of Erris (Green) within County Mayo

- Location in Ireland
- Country: Ireland
- Province: Connacht
- County: County Mayo
- Municipal district: Belmullet
- Dáil Éireann: Mayo
- EU Parliament: Midlands–North-West

Area
  - Total: 932.6 km^{2} (360.1 sq mi)

Population (Census 2016)
  - Total: 8,278
  - Density: 8.876/km^{2} (22.99/sq mi)
- Time zone: UTC+0 (GMT (UTC))
  - Summer (DST): UTC-1 (IST (WEST))
- Dialing code: +353 41

Erris is a barony in northwestern County Mayo in Ireland consisting of over 230,452 acres (932.61 km^{2}), much of which is mountainous blanket bog. It has extensive sea coasts along its west and north boundaries. The main towns are Belmullet and Bangor Erris. The name Erris derives from the Irish 'Iar Ros' meaning 'western promontory'. The full name is the Iorrais Domnann, after the Fir Bolg tribe, the Fir Domnann. To its north is the wild Atlantic Ocean and the bays of Broadhaven and Sruth Fada Conn and to its west is Blacksod Bay. Its main promontories are the Doohoma Peninsula, Mullet Peninsula, Erris Head, the Dún Chiortáin and Dún Chaocháin peninsulas and Benwee Head.

There are five Catholic parishes in Erris: Kilcommon, Kilmore, Kiltane, Belmullet and Ballycroy.

== Gaeltacht ==
Map of the Gaeltacht region of Iorras Domhnann, in the north of County Mayo

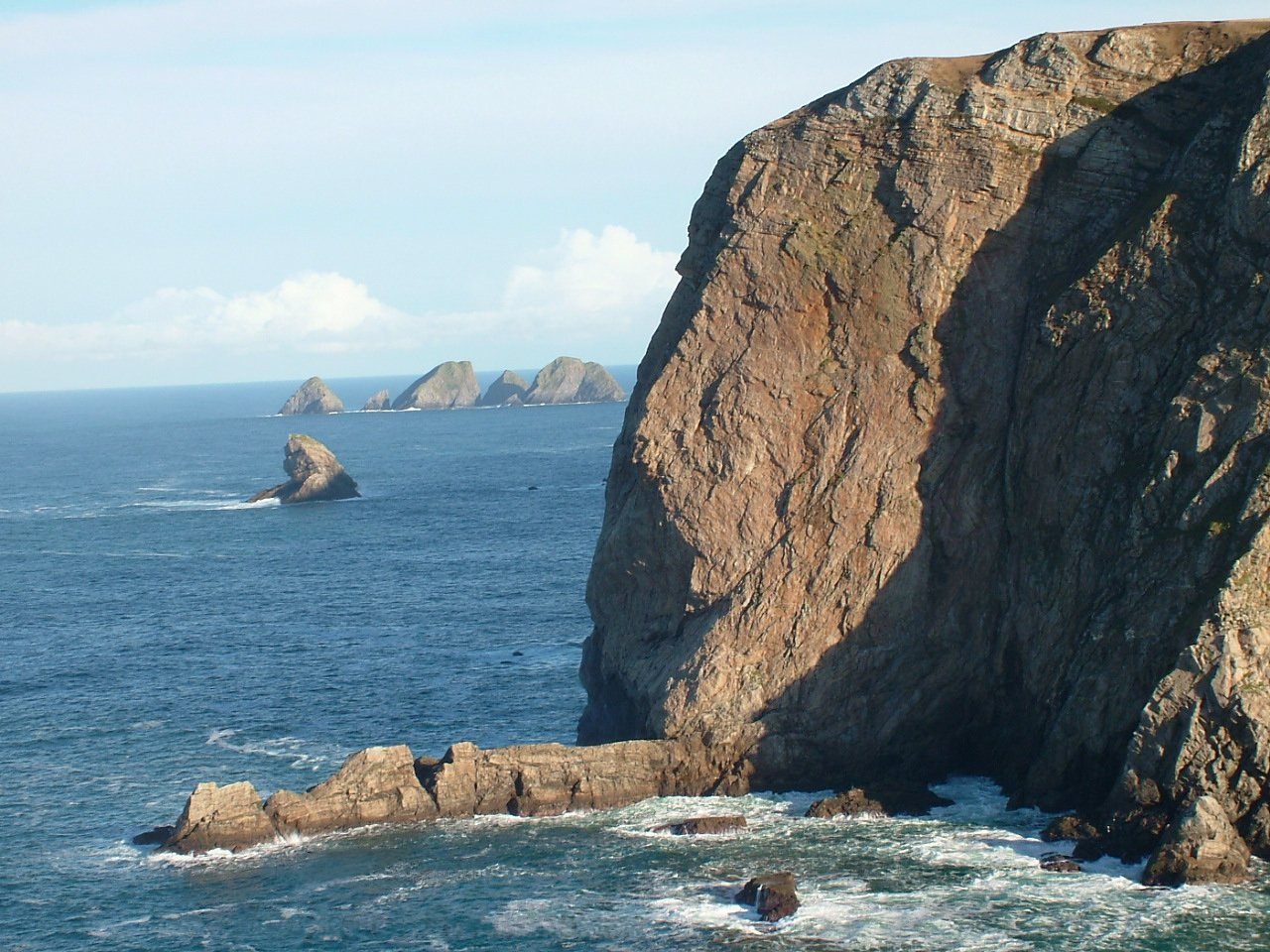
The Stags of Broadhaven Bay with Benwee Head in the foreground

Parts of Erris are in a Gaeltacht area, with first-language speakers of Irish in the following areas of the barony: An Fál Mór, Tamhain na hUltaí, Glais, Eachléim, Tearmann, Tránn, An Mullach Rua, Cartúr, An Baile Úr, Cill Ghallagáin, An Corrán Buí, Ceathrú na gCloch, Port a' Chluaidh, Ros Dumhach and Ceathrú Thaidhg. The area with the most Irish speakers is Ceathrú Thaidhg. There are between 3,500-5,000 native Irish speakers in Erris.

== Geography ==
=== Topography and geology ===
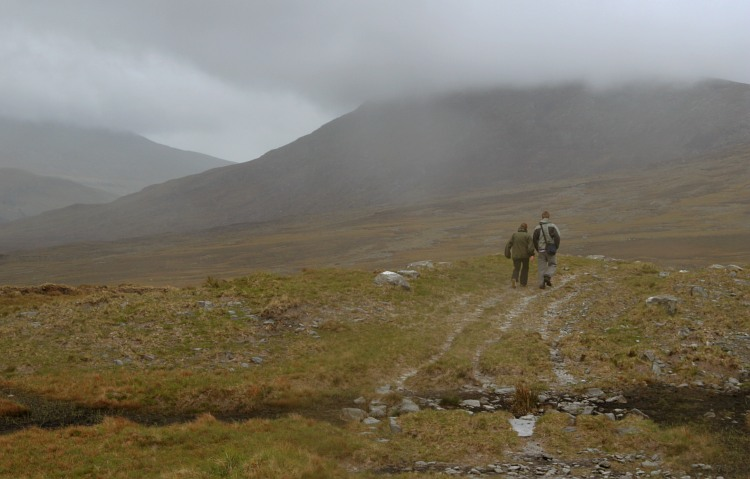
Bangor Way way-marked walking trail

Much of inland Erris is covered with blanket bog. A triangle between Ballycroy, Bellacorick and Bangor Erris consists of little else over its surface. Blanket bog, unlike raised bog, grows slowly across the landscape like a blanket covering the ground, due to a continuous supply of water from rainfall, maintaining waterlogged conditions on the ground. The bog is acidic with a pH of between 3.5 and 4.2. This is Atlantic blanket bog and it provides a suitable habitat for many species of flora, particularly small species of mosses, bryophytes, carnivorous plants and delicate flowers such as the scarlet pimpernel. Species of fauna found on Atlantic blanket bog, include smaller varieties such as frogs and insects as well as many bird varieties, not common elsewhere.

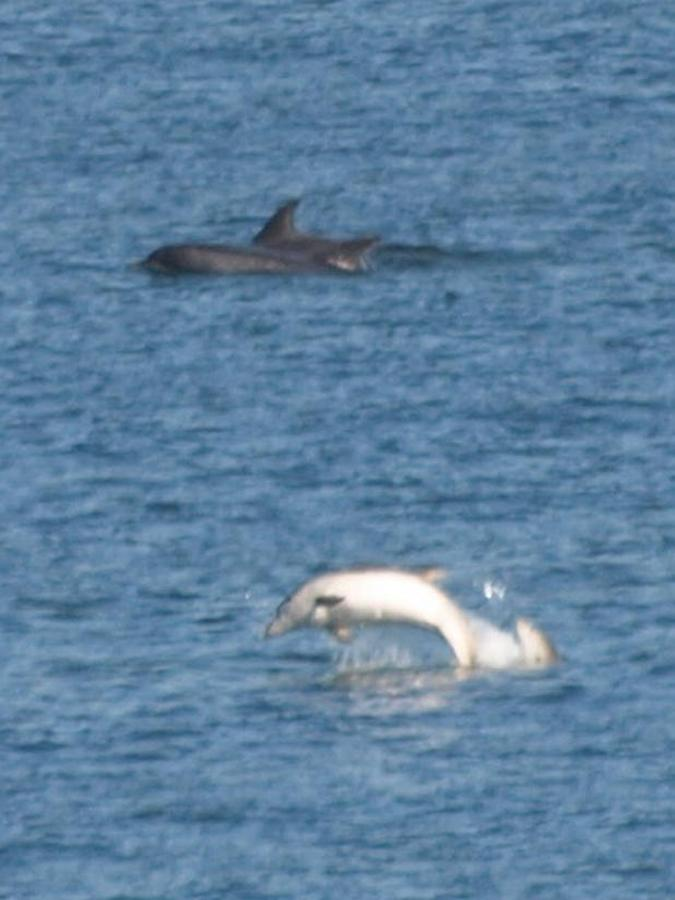
Dolphins in Sruwaddacon Bay August 2010

Several areas of the blanket bog are protected under European legislation such as Special Areas of Conservation, Special Protection Areas (Birds Directive) and Natural Heritage Areas. These include the Glenamoy Bog Complex, Ballycroy National Park and Bellacorick.

Erris has a large range of habitats including blanket bogs, estuaries, salt marshes, fresh water lakes, coasts, cliffs, machair, sand dunes, sandy beaches and rocky shores. It is an important area for bird watchers as the largely treeless landscape allows relatively easy access for birdwatching. Brent geese overwinter here feeding along the estuaries, and corncrake, chough, rock dove and twite are sometimes seen at Erris Head. Sightings of rarer birds, such as the grey phalarope, booted warbler and Wilson's petrel, have also been recorded.

The oldest rocks in Ireland, some 1.8 billion years old, are to be found on the west coasts of Erris. Pink or orange striped gneisses are found along the beaches of Elly Bay and Annagh Head where they have become separated from the same rocks on the east coast of Northern Canada over hundreds of millions of years by the separation of tectonic plates in the mid Atlantic Ocean. "Erris Head" (Irish: Ceann Iorrais) is a promontory at the northernmost tip of the Mullet Peninsula. It is a landmark known well by mariners and is one of the sea areas cited by Met Éireann's weather forecasters. The coastline of Erris has some of "the grandest sea cliffs in Ireland" over the Atlantic Ocean from where the next stop is the east coast of America. Erris Head is not served by any road and can only be reached by crossing a number of fields from the hamlet of Glenlara where the road ends.

=== Settlements and islands ===
Along the coast there are several uninhabited islands. These include the Inishkea Islands, Inishglora, Duvillaun, the Stags of Broadhaven Bay and other smaller islands.

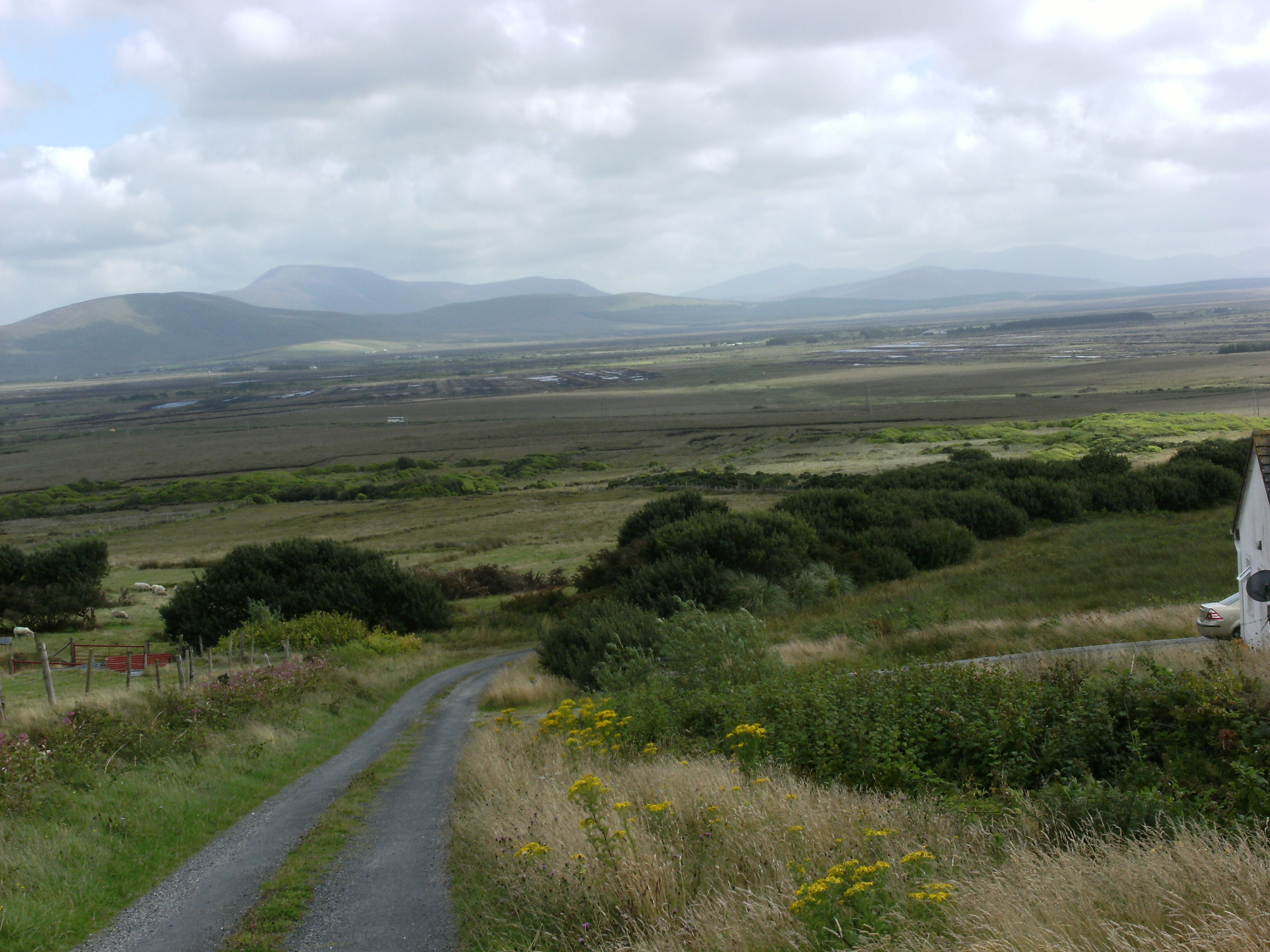
View across Erris blanket bog southwards from Carrowmore Lake

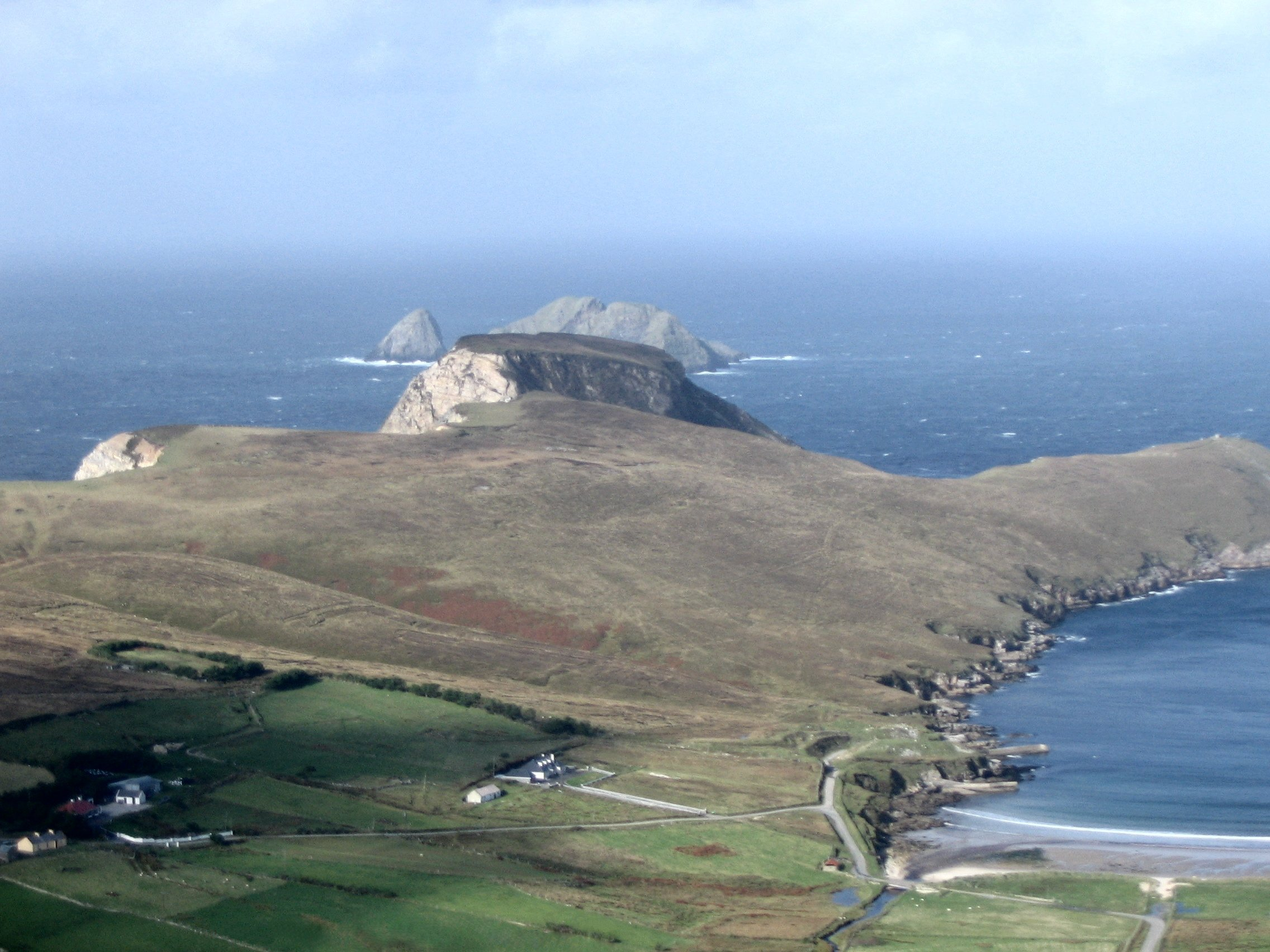
An Dúna at Kilgalligan, Kilcommon, Erris

== Archaeology and history ==
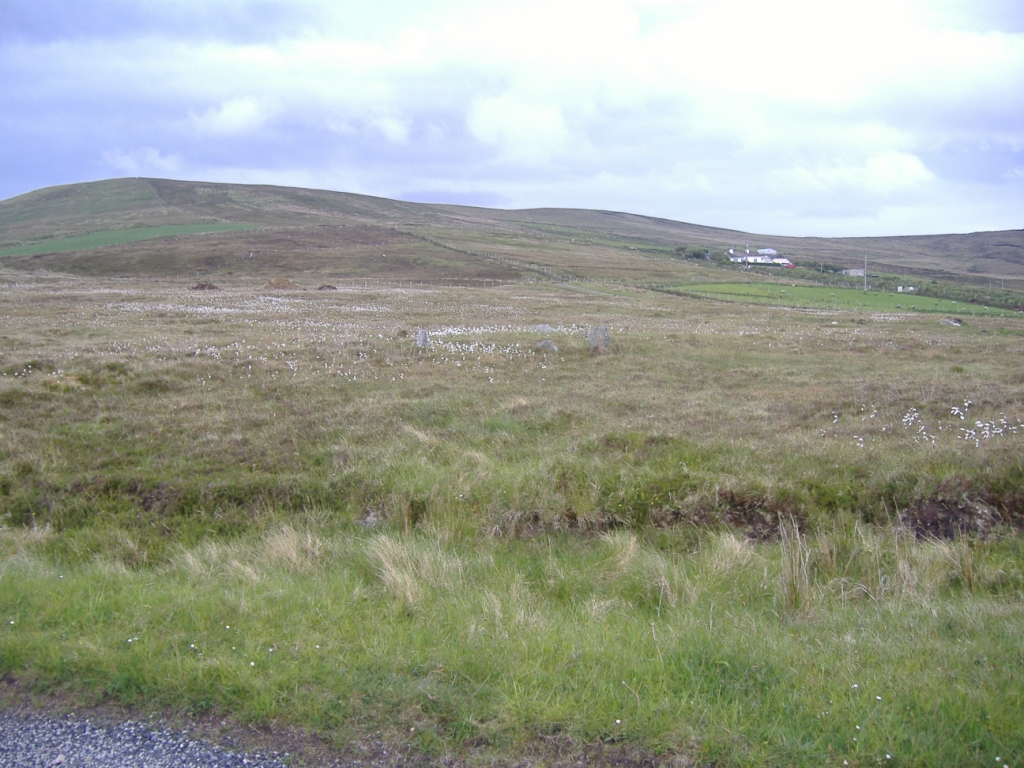
A little stone circle at Gortbrack, Kilcommon parish, Erris.

Erris, in common with most of inland Ireland, became covered in extensive native woodland a few thousand years after the last Ice Age retreated (approx 15,000 years ago) but its northern and western shores remained relatively lightly afforested. Across inland Erris, the remains of these forests can be seen across the blanket bog landscape in the form of fossilised greying tree stumps which are mainly the remains of ancient Scots pine trees. These become most obvious where there has been harvesting of turf (peat) for fuel. The odd petrified bog oak can be found too.

During the Neolithic period, starting about 6,000 years ago, the first people living in Ireland whose ancestors had hunted and gathered along the coastlines of Erris from about 9,000 years ago, began to cut down the forestry to clear land for growing crops and grazing livestock. Because the underlying rock type was ancient and heavily weathered schists the soil was thin and easily eroded by inclement weather. After a couple of years the crops began to fail and the Neolithic people had to clear the native woodlands further and further inland to clear more land for their crops. With minor changes in climate and high rainfall levels the land became blanketed by the bog and remains that way to the current day. When present-day turf cutters harvest the bog for fuel, archaeological remains, mainly from the Neolithic and early Bronze Age, which have become buried under the bog often come to light. Some archaeological sites are marked on Ordnance Survey maps.

The period of Early Christianity saw several small churches set up but no major religious houses came to the area. During the Plantations of Ireland, there were two major landlords in the area - the Binghams and the Carters. Oliver Cromwell's policy (mid 17th century) of sending the native Irish who refused to bow down to him "to hell or to Connaught" saw a large influx of population into Erris where the disinherited native Irish tried to eke a living from very poor quality agricultural land under the tenancy of the landlords and their agents. During the Irish Famine of 1845 - '47 many died in Erris despite the close proximity of the sea, because they could not raise the cash to fund a passage to America.

Some 19th- and early 20th-century antiquarians and surveyors visited the Erris area and wrote about their experiences and thoughts on the area at that time. These include works by Patrick Knight (Erris in the Irish Highlands), Caesar Otway (Sketches in Erris and Tyrawley) and Thomas Johnson Westropp (The Promontory Forts and Early Remains of the Coast of Mayo). The Ulster Cycle legend of the Táin Bó Flidhais concerns the Barony of Erris in the time period of approx the 1st century AD.

=== Rescue 116 search ===
The community of Erris gave support to the extensive search and rescue operation following the 2017 Irish Coast Guard Rescue 116 crash. For its efforts, the community and the Irish Coast Guard were awarded a People of the Year Award in 2018.

== Legend and folklore ==
Folklore is an important part of the culture of Erris.

A number of well-known folklore tales have their origins in (or are associated with) the area. The Children of Lir, according to tradition, are buried on the island of Inisglora. The children were turned into swans by their jealous stepmother and doomed to spend the next 900 years on lakes and waters in Ireland. When they finally reclaimed their human form on Inisglora, they were so old that they died and were buried there.

Táin Bó Flidhais is the tale of a cattle raid in which raiders came to Erris from the Royal site at Cruachán (Rathcroghan) at Tulsk, County Roscommon to Rathmorgan Fort (Iorras Domhnann) at the south end of Carrowmore Lake in the centre of the Barony. The remains of Rathmorgan fort on top of the mountain can be seen from the road below.

Brian Rua U'Cearbhain from Inver is remembered in folklore as the prophet of Erris.

The small village of Glencastle has some large mounds in the narrow valley that are not naturally occurring. They can be seen on the right hand side, close to the roadside on the approach to Belmullet from the east. These have never been archaeologically investigated but folklore legends recall that this was the old gateway into the Mullet and a toll had to be paid for each traveller who passed through or the traveller may never be seen again. There were no roads through this area of Mayo until less than two hundred years ago. In recent years the Glencastle Valley has been drastically altered by extensive quarrying.

== Water sports ==
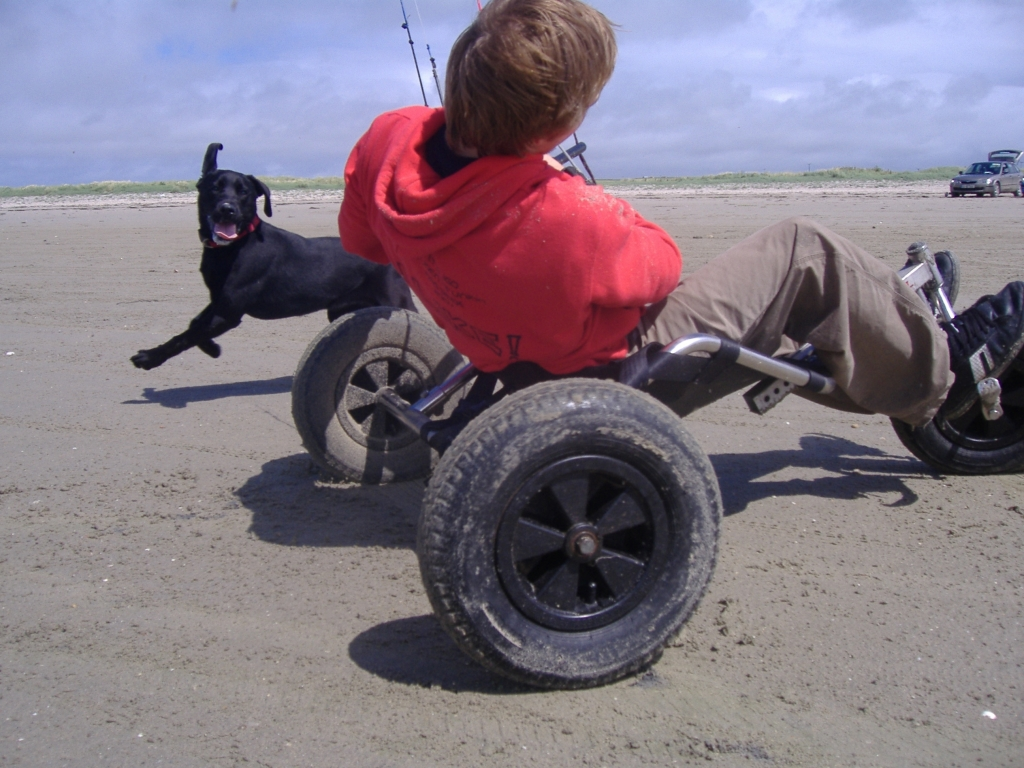
Kite buggying fun at Claggan Island tombola, Erris

Erris is a popular location for many types of watersports ranging through fishing, sailing, surfing, swimming, wind surfing, kiteboarding and kite surfing.

== Walking trails ==
There are a number of walking trails in Erris. These include cliff walks above the Atlantic at Broadhaven Bay along Benwee Head, Glinsk and the North Mayo coastline, as well as mountain walks across uninhabited natural wilderness, and long distance walks such as the Bangor Trail and the Western Way.

In 1993, the Tír Sáile Sculpture Trail project was carried out to commemorate 5,000 years of habitation in County Mayo. This trail extends through parts of Erris from the tip of the Mullet Peninsula, through Kilcommon, Belderrig and Ballycastle. The first sculptures along this trail were erected in 1993, with several more added subsequently. The creation of the sculpture trail took the form of the Meitheal, a traditional method of working where a group of workers come together to achieve a common objective.

== Natural resources ==
Erris has considerable potential for ocean energy in terms of its location next to the Atlantic Ocean and constant winds from the sea. These resources have been earmarked for development. There are opportunities for the development of ocean wave power projects, tidal power, hydroelectric schemes, and, wind farms amongst other clean, alternative energy generation opportunities for which the area is eminently suitable.

=== Corrib gas field ===
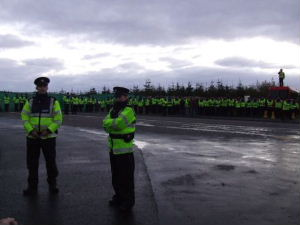
Garda Síochána at Bellanaboy

The discovery of the Corrib gas field in the Atlantic Ocean some 85 km off Broadhaven Bay has led to the Corrib gas project and ensuing controversy. Raw, unodourised natural gas from fields under the Atlantic Ocean is planned to be piped at high pressure at Glengad and through the townlands of Kilcommon, to a refinery 10 km inland. Documentaries have been made on the subject . A documentary film, The Pipe by local film-maker, Richard O'Donnell, had its first showing at the Galway Film Festival on Thursday 8 July 2010, went on general release in cinemas nationwide from 3 December 2010.

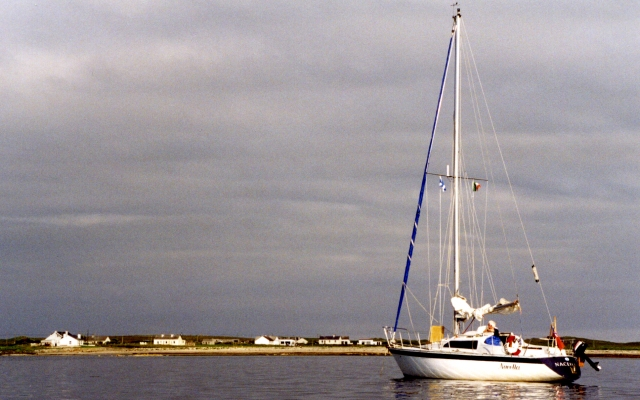
Elly Bay on the Mullet peninsula
