= R313 road (Ireland) =

Road in Ireland

R313 road
- Bóthar R313
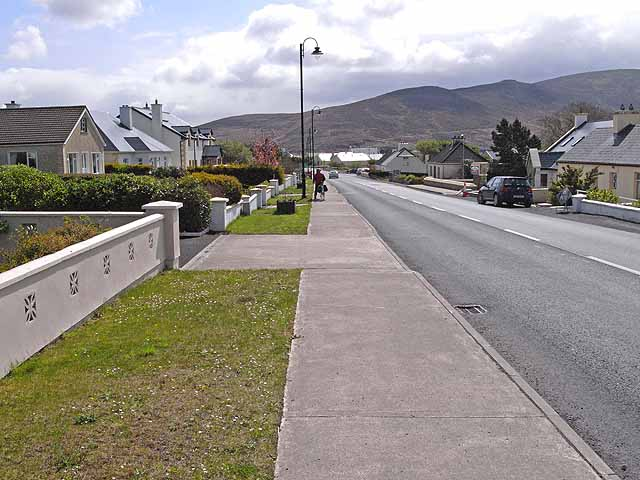
- Approaching Bangor Erris on the R313

Route information
- Length: 40 km (25 mi)

Location
- Country: Ireland
- Primary destinations: County Mayo; Bangor Erris (N59); (L1206 local road); (L1204 local road); Crosses the Munkin River; Bunnahowen (L1205 local road); R314 road; Atticonaun; Belmullet (L1201 local road); Binghamstown; Aghleam; Blacksod

Highway system
- Roads in Ireland; Motorways; Primary; Secondary; Regional

The R313 road is a regional road in County Mayo in Ireland. It connects the town of Bangor Erris to Blacksod at the tip of the Mullet Peninsula, 40 kilometres (25 mi) away (map).

The government legislation that defines the R313, the Roads Act 1993 (Classification of Regional Roads) Order 2012 (Statutory Instrument 54 of 2012), provides the following official description:

Bangor — An Fod Dubh, County Mayo

Between its junction with N59 at Bangor and its terminal point at Caladh an Fód Dubh via Munhin Bridge, Gleann Chaissil, Áit Tí Conain; Sraid na Bearice, An Chearnóg, Sráid Mheiriceá, and An Droichead Nua at Béal an Mhuirthead; An Geata Mór, Oilligh and An Eachléim all in the county of Mayo.

== See also ==
- List of roads of County Mayo
- National primary road
- National secondary road
- Regional road
- Roads in Ireland
