= Fallmore =

Village in County Mayo, Ireland

Fallmore An Fál Mór Faulmore
- Townland
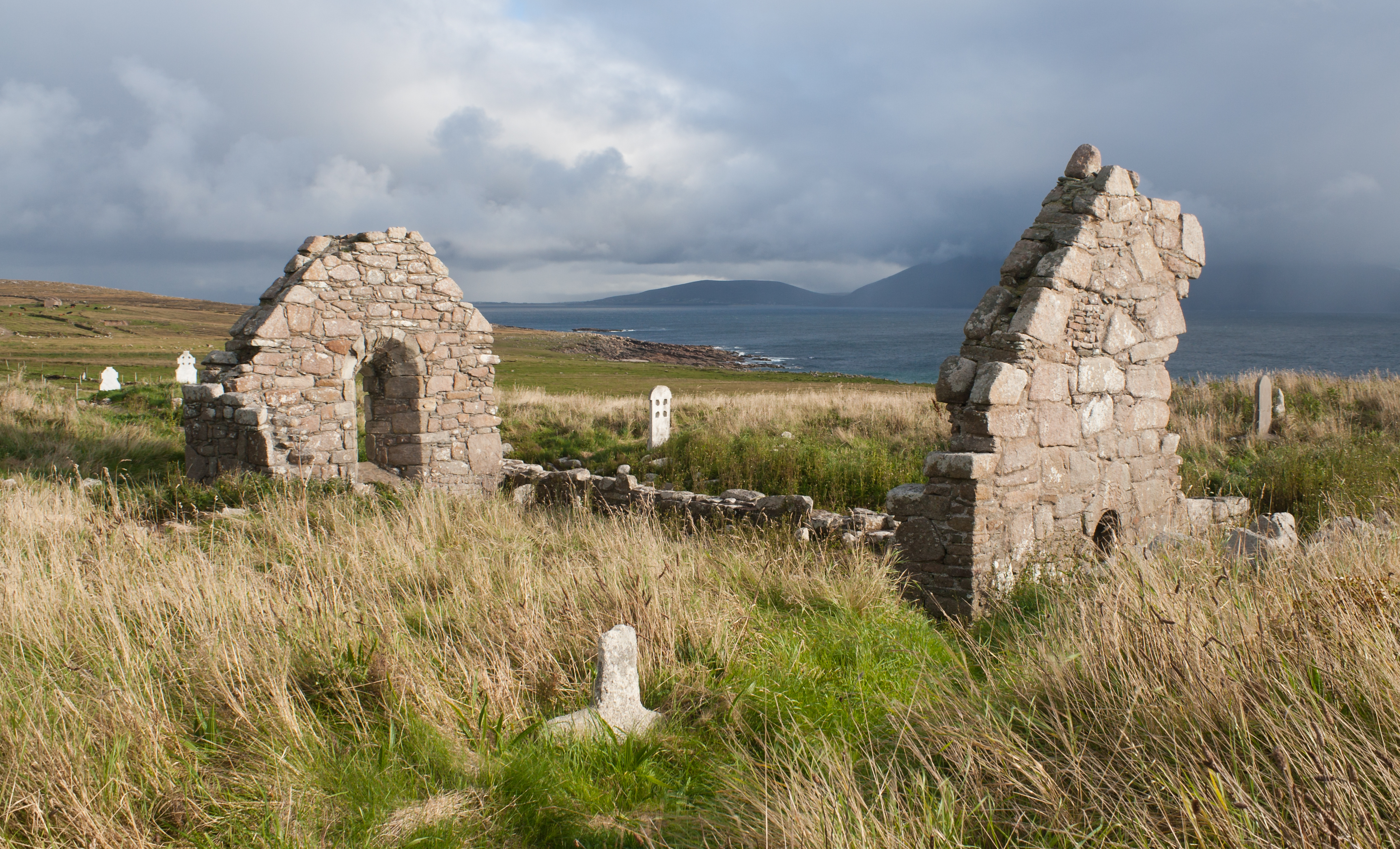
- St. Dairbhile's Church, Fallmore

- Location in Ireland
- Coordinates: 54°05′42″N 10°05′10″W
- Country: Ireland
- Province: Connacht
- County: County Mayo

Area
  - Total: 2.84 km^{2} (1.10 sq mi)

Population (2011)
  - Total: 75
  - Density: 26/km^{2} (68/sq mi)
- Time zone: UTC+0 (WET)
  - Summer (DST): UTC-1 (IST (WEST))
- As this is a Gaeltacht village, An Fál Mór is the only official name. The anglicised spellings Fallmore and Faulmore have no official status.

Fallmore (Irish: An Fál Mór, also known as Faulmore) is a Gaeltacht village and townland in County Mayo, Ireland. Situated in the southern part of the Mullet Peninsula within the barony of Erris, Fallmore townland spans approximately 704 acres (2.84 km^{2}) and, as of 2011, had a population of 75 people. Fallmore townland also encompasses the village of Blacksod. The nearest town is Belmullet, 15 km to the north (22 km by road).

== History ==
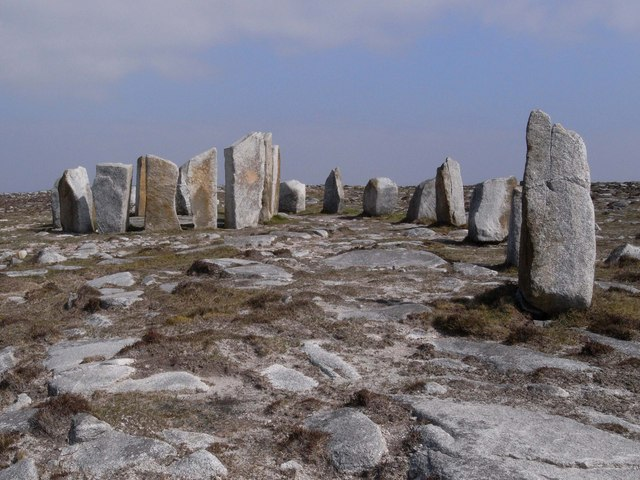
Dairbhile's Twist, a modern granite sculpture at the south of the peninsula

=== Early history ===
The townland contains medieval settlement such as at Saint Dairbhile's Church, a National Monument, dating back to the 11th and 12th centuries. The structure contains polygonal masonry, and excavations have uncovered foundations of older parts of the church.

The church was named after the anchoress Dairbhile (575–600) who resided here. Tradition holds that Saint Dairbhile is buried at the site of the church.

The church is placed on a knoll overlooking a sandy beach and an contains an old, densely populated cemetery. Legend has it that passing through the window three times ensures safety from drowning. The current ruins likely date back to the twelfth century, possibly replacing or integrating an earlier building. The nearby Saint Dairbhile's Well, is a holy well, with a pilgrimage taking place annually on August 15. The waters of the well are said to be a cure for eye problems.

=== Rundale system ===
Tom Yager conducted numerous studies on the rundale system of tenancy in Fallmore, noting that in the early nineteenth century, Erris communities commonly practiced communal land ownership in the form of Rundale, redistributing plots periodically. The community, he found, followed a common crop rotation plan, alternating between grain and potatoes. In an 1836 book, Patrick Knight, the engineer who planned and supervised the construction of Belmullet for William Carter, one of Erris's two principal landlords, describes a three-year rotation. However, Knight mentions only two crops, so, Yager suggests, a third field lay fallow, gathering strength for the next year's crop.

In the mid 19th century, the landscape of Fallmore consisted of larger, open fields owned collectively by the entire village, interspersed with unclearly defined individual plots for families. In contrast, today's Fallmore features mostly smaller, privately owned fields separated by clear boundaries like earthen walls or barbed wire fences. The tradition of the communal pasture persisted until the beginning of the 1980s, at which point the Land Commission partitioned a large proportion of the agricultural land in the village into separate parcels. However, much of Fallmore is still managed as unfenced commonage and is in better ecological condition than the other sections which has been fenced and used more intensively.

=== Mass evictions ===
Fallmore was host to a notable instance of post-Famine clearance, documented through the actions of clergyman William Palmer in 1857. Purchasing the neighbouring townlands of Termon and Fallmore, Palmer initiated a process of reorganising the land, from Rundale into a more efficient system, through striping, resettlement and eviction.

Records from valuation documents indicate a plan to clear the land by the following year, with subsequent entries detailing the eviction proceedings. Despite the eviction, many individuals remained, constructing makeshift shelters, absent from taxation records due to their impermanence. An account by correspondent Henry Coulter in January 1862 described the conditions observed:

...that is the position of the inhabitants of Fallmore, a small village at the extreme southern point of the island, the property of an English clergyman named Palmer, who some two years ago evicted nearly half the village... I thought it would be difficult to find another community exceeding in wretchedness of appearance the village of Fallmore; but I had not proceeded far when my attention was directed to a collection of hovels such as I should think is not to be found elsewhere in Ireland. These were the abodes built by some of the persons evicted from Fallmore. They are composed of large pieces of granite found on the beach and rudely placed together. The roofs are very nearly flat, and each hovel is so low that an ordinary man cannot stand upright in it, and so small, that it can hardly contain three or four persons at the same time... These people cultivate half an acre or so of poor and sandy soil, from which they have obtained a sufficient quantity of potatoes to last them for another month or so; but when these are exhausted, I do not know how they are to exist, for they do not appear to have any stock, and I am sure they have no money.

— Henry Coulter, The West of Ireland: Its Existing Condition and Prospects (Dublin, 1862), pp. 217–220

== Geography ==
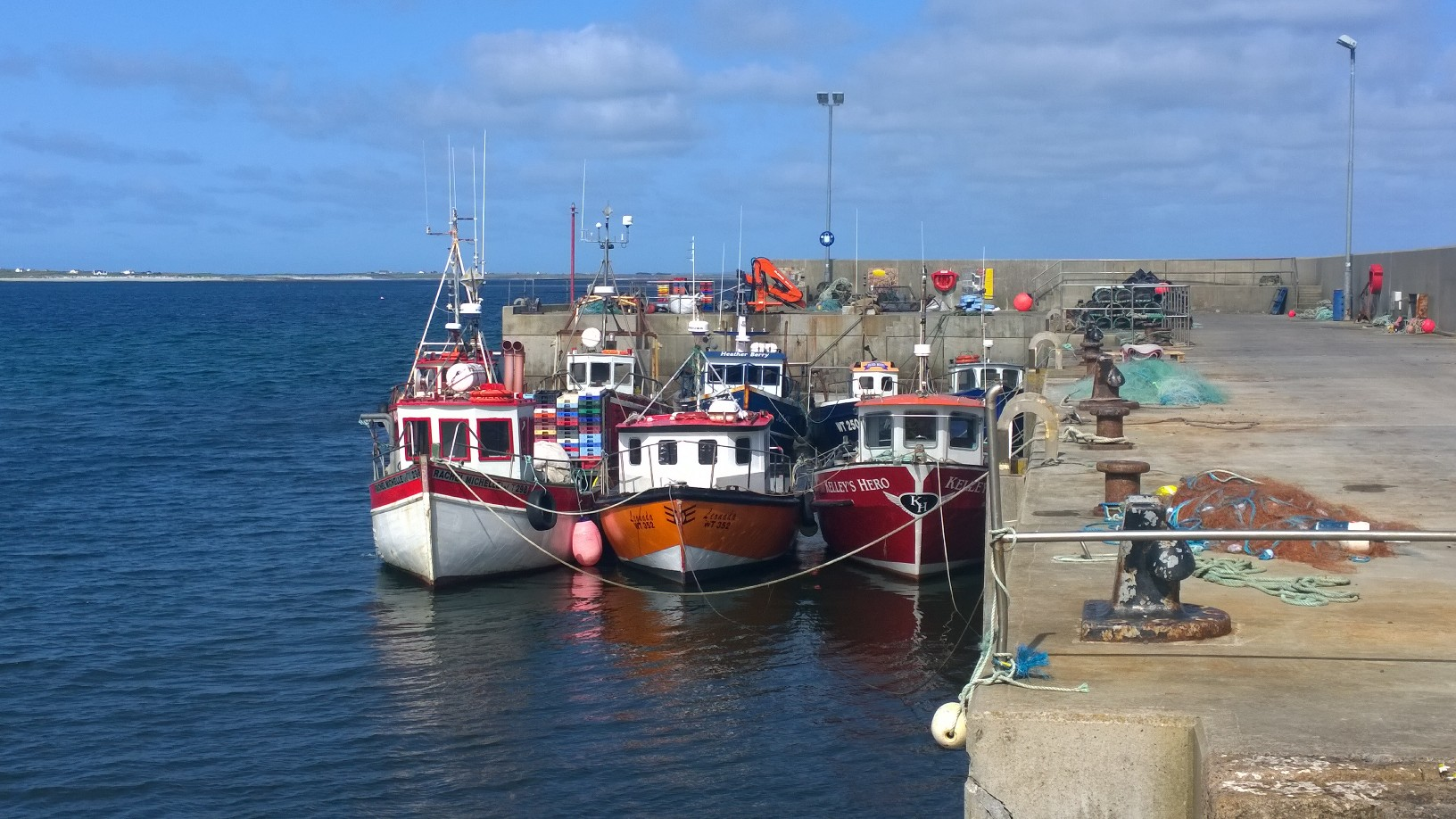
Blacksod Fishing Port

Shaped by the Atlantic Ocean, the landscape is characterised by blown sand and a scarcity of trees due to its exposed location. The geology of the townland is composed of gneiss bedrock and metamorphic schist.

The area contains an extensive amount of fixed dunes and hilly machair. The tallest point in Fallmore is at Termon Hill which has an elevation of 103m.

=== Special Areas of Conservation and Protection ===
Portions of the townland form part of the Mullet/ Blacksod Bay Special Area of Conservation. Overgrazing in the mid twentieth century at the site eroded the sand dunes, but local landowners later stabilised them using suitable sand-trapping methods. Vegetation has since recovered and the current levels of bare sands are considered adequate to sustain habitat diversity in the dunes.

A variety of wintering and other birds are present in Fallmore, including the Brent Goose, Ringed Plover and Dunlin. Fallmore also recorded, in 2005/6, a population of 5 Corn crake pairs.

== See also ==
- Blacksod Bay
- List of Saints of Ireland
