= Doohoma =

Doohoma Dumha Thuama
- Townland
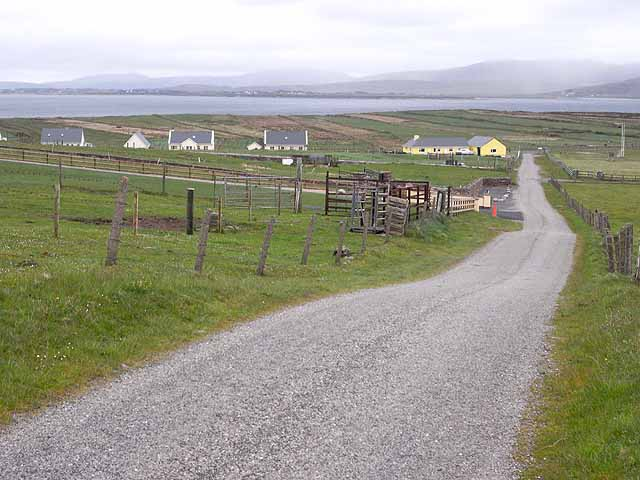
- Road to Doohoma Head

- Location in Ireland
- Coordinates: 54°04′N 9°58′W
- Country: Ireland
- Province: Connacht
- County: County Mayo

Population (2022)
  - Total: 110
- Time zone: UTC+0 (WET)
  - Summer (DST): UTC-1 (IST (WEST))
- Irish Grid Reference: F719152

Doohoma or Doohooma (in Irish, and officially, Dumha Thuama) is a townland, peninsula and (since 2016) a census town in the County Mayo Gaeltacht, Ireland. It is located on Ireland's Atlantic coastline overlooking Achill Island and the Mullet Peninsula.

== Geography ==
Doohoma is situated on the north-west coast of Kiltane parish, Erris, County Mayo. The townland is approximately 1,075 acres (4.35 km^{2}) in area. It is situated approximately fifteen miles (24 km) south west of the village of Bangor Erris. It overlooks Achill Island and the Mullet Peninsula. The area has sea views across Blacksod Bay. Its beaches and bays are used for watersports such as surfing, kiting, sailing, swimming, fishing, boating and wind surfing.. It is part of the Mayo Gaeltacht.

Doohoma is the central village and collective name for a further six villages, which include Doohoma Head (Cean Romhar), Crook na Mona, Bunnafully, Tallaghan, Roy Carter and Roy Bingham. There are two pubs, The Sea Rod Inn (Barrett's) and Tra Bui (Holmes's) and one grocery store. Other amenities include the local Roman Catholic church (dedicated to Pope Pius X) and the Doohoma National School.

== History ==
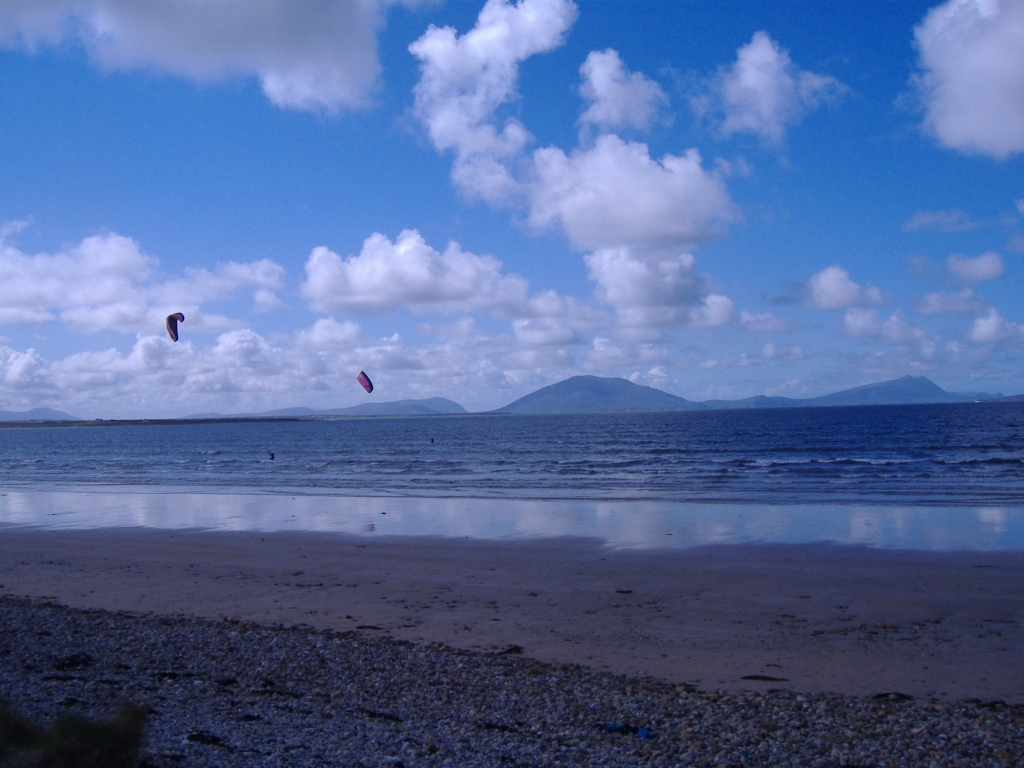
Kite surfing on Claggan beach

Like other parts of County Mayo, Doohoma was adversely affected during the famine years of the 1840s and 1850s. The population of 455 people in 1841 was more than halved to 218 people by 1851. It endured high levels of emigration throughout the years, with the diaspora of Doohoma spreading to countries including England, Scotland, the United States, Australia and Canada. The first main road through the townland was not built until 1847.

After the famine, mass burials took place on the sandbanks and, despite repeated requests by the local people for a proper cemetery, the requests were repeatedly rejected by the civil authorities. Eventually, in 1926 three hundred local men erected a sod wall, which was later consecrated by Bishop James Naughton. Eventually Mayo County Council granted some money to erect a stone wall to replace the sod ditch. Later local residents were unsuccessful in their endeavours to get a road built from the sandbanks to the cemetery, so in 1967 over 100 volunteers built a road to improve access. In 1989 the Council tarred the road for the first time.

Fishing was the main occupation of the community but did not sustain the population entirely - so every year in June whole families would go to the potato fields of Scotland. These workers were known as "tattie hokers". There were so many who went from Doohoma, that ships would moor off Doohoma Head to transport them to the potato fields of Scotland.

The first national school was established in Doohoma in 1859 just outside the boundary of the Tallaghanbawn townland and the first church in the townland was built close by later.

A new industry was opened in the early 1970s. Eagle Isle Seafoods was founded in 1972 and became an exporter of smoked wild Atlantic salmon.

In 1987, Mayo County Council financed a two million pound water scheme. This brought piped water from Carrowmore Lake.

The townland was covered in the RTÉ documentary 'Doohoma' which dealt with the theme of emigration to England and the effect on local families. In subsequent years, however, a number of first and second-generation natives returned to take advantage of the improving economic climate.

Doohoma was designated as a census town by the Central Statistics Office for the first time in the 2016 census, at which time it had a population of 112 people.

== Sports ==
Doohoma has a football tradition. Doohoma Golf Club is an 18-hole golf course overlooking the Atlantic.

== See also ==
- List of towns and villages in Ireland
