= St. Dairbhile's Church =

- Teampall Deirbhile
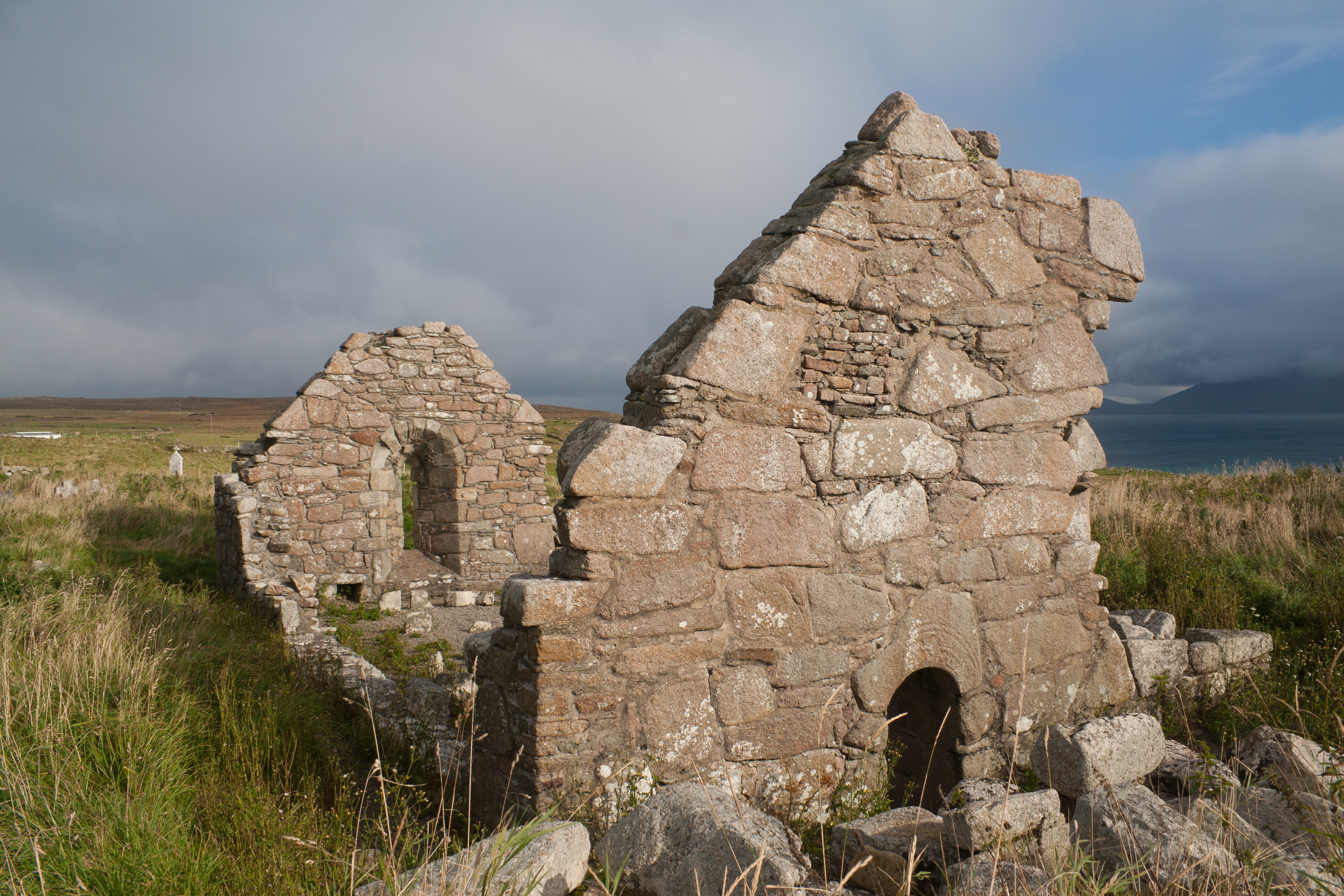

- Location within Ireland
- 54.096168°N 10.106915°W
- Location: Fallmore, Aughleam, County Mayo
- Country: Ireland
- Denomination: Celtic Christianity

Architecture
- Functional status: inactive
- Years built: 12th century

Specifications
- Length: 12.19 m (40.0 ft)
- Width: 4.87 m (16.0 ft)
- Materials: granite, ashlar

Administration
- Diocese: Killala
Designations
National monument of Ireland
- Official name: St. Dairbhile's Church
- Reference no.: 99A

St. Dairbhile's Church is a medieval church and National Monument in County Mayo, Ireland.

== Location ==
St. Dairbhile's Church is located 2.4 km (1½ miles) south of Aughleam in the townland of Fallmore, on the Mullet Peninsula.

== History ==
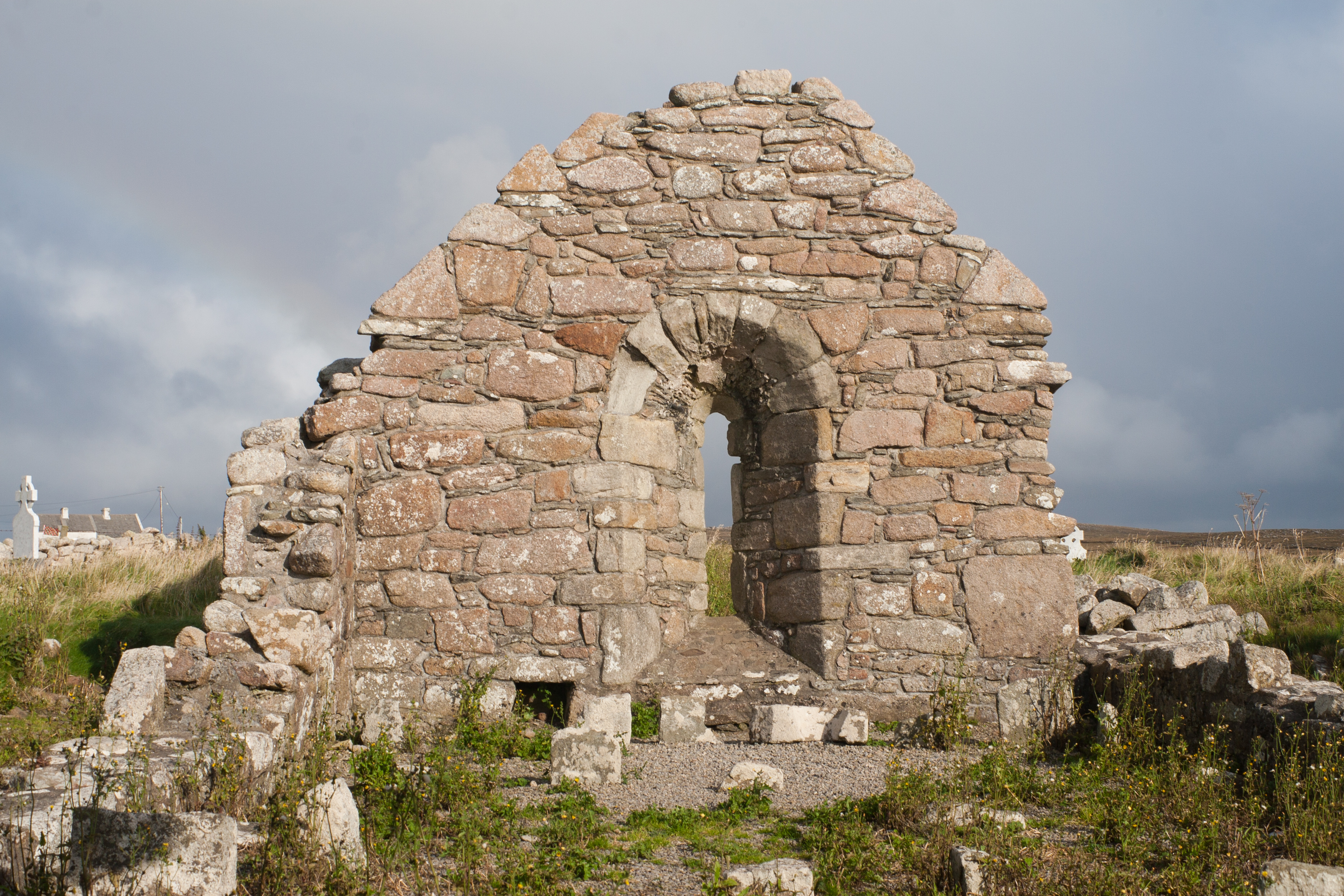
West window

St. Dairbhile's Church was constructed in the 6th century, although the current structure is from the 12th century.

According to legend, if someone can squeeze themselves through the east window three times, they will never die from drowning.

Legend tells us that in the 6th century St. Dairbhile (Darbiled), a native of Meath, travelled to the Mullet Peninsula to escape an admirer. However, she was followed here, and gouged out her own eyes to make herself less attractive. When her horrified lover left, she washed her eyes in the waters of a well and her sight was restored. This is St. Deirbhile's Well, which is located nearby. A pattern takes place annually on 15 August.

== Buildings ==
St. Dairbhile's Church is a gabled single-cell church, now in ruins. The church has a narrow ashlar-lined, deeply-splayed east window with an arcuated lintel, and a narrow west doorway with inclined jambs and arcuated lintel.
