= Binghamstown =

Village in County Mayo, Ireland

Binghamstown An Geata Mór
- Townland
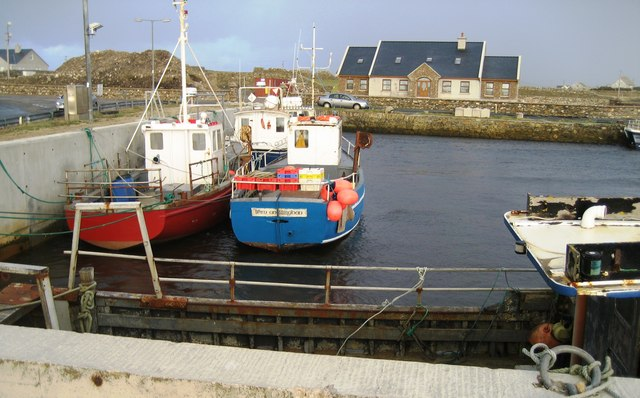
- Saleen Harbour is 1 km south of Binghamstown village

- Location in Ireland
- Coordinates: 54°12′N 10°02′W
- Country: Ireland
- Province: Connacht
- County: County Mayo

Area
  - Total: 293.6 ha (725.6 acres)

Population (2011)
  - Total: 106
- Irish Grid Reference: F671302

Binghamstown (Irish: An Geata Mór) is a townland and village in County Mayo, Ireland. It lies on the R313 regional road on the Mullet Peninsula, near the town of Belmullet. The townland of Binghamstown has an area of approximately 3 square kilometres (1 sq mi), and had a population of 106 people as of the 2011 census. Binghamstown is in the electoral division of An Geata Mór Thuaidh.

== History ==
The townland was originally called Ballymacshedon (the anglicisation of an Irish name), before being renamed Binghamstown after the local landlords. The Bingham family came to the Erris area of County Mayo in the 18th century, and built a large house on the northern reaches of Elly Bay on the Mullet peninsula in 1796. Known as Binghamstown House, this structure was built in castellated style and had outbuildings, offices and gardens. Nothing substantial survives of this building except for low grass covered foundations.

The village itself was built in 1796 by Major Denis Bingham, and it was built essentially as a "landlord village" providing services for the Bingham estate. It was not until 1817 that a main road was constructed into Erris from Castlebar and it was only in 1824 that it finally ran through Binghamstown to the extremity of the peninsula.

In an attempt to keep the Binghamstown fair alive, Major Bingham erected a large gate across the roadway. Those who took their animals out of Binghamstown to the Belmullet fair had to pay a toll as they passed through the gate, giving rise to the Irish name an Geata Mhór (the Big Gate) for Binghamstown.

In A Topographical Dictionary of Ireland, published in 1837 by Samuel Lewis, the fair at Binghamstown is described as taking place on the "first day of every month throughout the year". By the end of the nineteenth century, the fair had declined. Lewis (1837) describes Binghamstown as having a "good view of Saleen bay" where "a landing pier has been erected by the late Fishery Board". The pier at Saleen harbour was built in the 1820s to designs by engineer Alexander Nimmo.

== See also ==
- List of towns and villages in Ireland
