= Henry Coyle =

Henry Coyle may refer to:

- Henry Coyle (boxer) (born 1982), Irish boxer
- Henry Coyle (politician) (died 1979), Irish army officer and Cumann na nGaedhael politician
