= Derrycorrib =

Derrycorrib Doire Choirb
- Townland
- Interactive map of Derrycorrib
- Coordinates: 54°12′15″N 9°54′57″W
- Country: Ireland
- County: Mayo
- Barony: Erris
- Civil Parish: Kilcommon
- Electoral Division: Glencastle

Area
  - Total: 2.8915 km^{2} (1.1164 sq mi)
- Townland rank: 5811th largest in Ireland
- Townland rank (within Mayo): 461st largest in Mayo

Derrycorrib (Irish: Doire Choirb) is a townland near Glencastle in County Mayo, Ireland. It is situated in the Glencastle Electoral Division within the Kilcommon Civil Parish, which is part of the Erris Barony. As of 2011, 59 people lived in Derrycorrib townland.

== Geography ==
Derrycorrib covers an area of approximately 2.9 square kilometres (1.1 sq mi). It is the 5811th largest townland in Ireland and the 461st largest within County Mayo.
