= Doolough =

Doolough Dumha Locha
- Townland
- Location in Ireland
- Coordinates: 54°08′37″N 9°55′46″W
- Country: Ireland
- Province: Connacht
- County: County Mayo
- Time zone: UTC+0 (WET)
  - Summer (DST): UTC-1 (IST (WEST))

Doolough (Irish: Dumha Locha, meaning 'black lake') is a coastal townland covering an area of approximately 2,493 acres (10 km^{2}) in the parish of Kiltane, Erris in north County Mayo, Ireland. It is southeast of Belmullet town and is part of the Mayo Gaeltacht.

== Population ==
As of 1841, just before the Great Famine, there were almost 600 people recorded as living here. By the 1911 census, that population had almost halved to 311 inhabitants. As of the 2011 census, Doolough townland had a population of 121.

== History ==
With the arrival of Anglo-Norman families into Erris, families of Barretts, Burkes and Lynotts settled in the Doolough area. Sir Edmund Barrett, Baron of Irrus is recorded as residing in a castle at Doolough in 1585. He was knighted by Queen Elizabeth I for his favours to the Crown. His sons Edmund and Richard were brought up in the household of Lord Essex in England. For the family's loyalty to the Crown, King James I in 1605 granted Sir Edmund more land in Erris and also a licence to hold a weekly fair at Doolough. The castle referred to was likely to have been located in the area known as Caislean or Caiseal. Part of the castle was still in use until 1937, and the cobbles and stones from the castle were removed for the making of roads and houses in the area. The Barrett family went into armed revolt against the Crown in the early 17th century. They were shot and hanged, and their property was confiscated.

By 1619, the castle was in the hands of Michael Cormuck who also owned the castle in Kilcommon, Erris. After the Cromwell period in the mid-17th century, the property passed into the hands of the new landlords of Erris - the Shaens, Carters and Binghams.

The first road connecting Erris with Ballina and Castlebar was completed in 1824. During the Irish Famine, the first substantial road to Doolough was constructed as a famine relief road. This allowed the people from Doolough to access the newly burgeoning Belmullet, situated approximately seven miles away. A road was also constructed to the Doolough Coastguard Station. During the Famine there were many evictions in the area, and the Bingham landowners living in Doolough were reputed to be cruel landlords. At the end of the nineteenth century when the Land League was most active, the people of the Doolough area were reputed to have been particularly vehement activists as a result of their poor treatment during the Famine.

In 1899, the landlords were approached by the Congested Districts Board to sell their estates. Arthur Shaen Bingham was willing to sell some parts of his property provided that he was paid such a price for the sale as he regarded was sufficient. Eventually, a deal was struck, and the Congested Districts Board and the Land Commission stripped and divided the land among the tenants.

In the 1950s, numerous skeletons were exposed by the prevailing winds on the sand banks in Doolough. This was a children's burial ground dating from the time of the Famine and the following years. The remains were collected in large boxes, and subsequently buried in Glencastle Cemetery.

Many vessels have been lost along the coastline of Doolough. The Thompson and the Mitchell, merchant ships, were shipwrecked on the coast and the Lee, a coastguard boat, was also lost. In the 1940s the Thelma, with a load of coal, drifted onto Doolough Point where she was wrecked. Coal can still be found among the rocks along here.

== Doolough Races ==
The Geesala Festival is a week-long community-based festival with a large range of events organised from the horse racing and dog racing events on the strand at Doolough, showjumping, deep sea fishing, and other events.
