= Glencullen, County Mayo =

Glencullen Gleann Cuilinn
- Townland
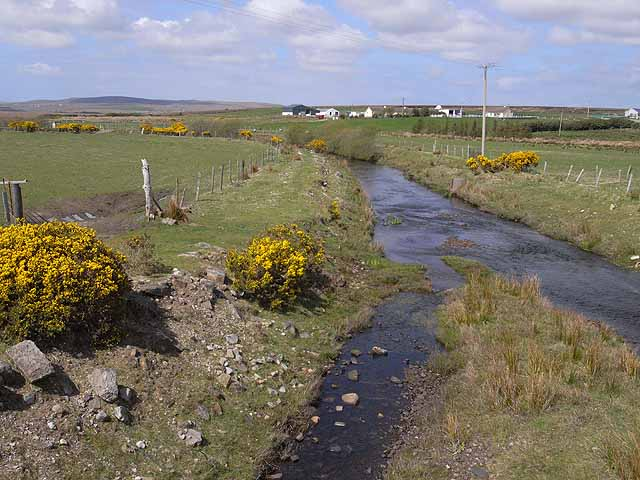
- Glencullin River flows through the area

- Location in Ireland
- Coordinates: 54°10′59″N 9°44′28″W
- Country: Ireland
- Province: Connacht
- County: County Mayo
- Elevation: 128 m (420 ft)
- Time zone: UTC+0 (WET)
  - Summer (DST): UTC-1 (IST (WEST))
- Irish Grid Reference: F863273

Glencullen or Glencullin (Irish: Gleann Chuilinn, meaning 'glen of the holly') is a rural area which spans two townlands in the parish of Kiltane in County Mayo, Ireland. It lies to the north of Bangor Erris, next to the parish of Kilcommon, Erris, and the Bangor to Kilcommon road runs through the area. The two constituent townlands, Glencullen Lower and Glencullen Upper, are located in an area of blanket bog and extend across approximately 2,125 acres and 2,780 acres respectively.

== History ==
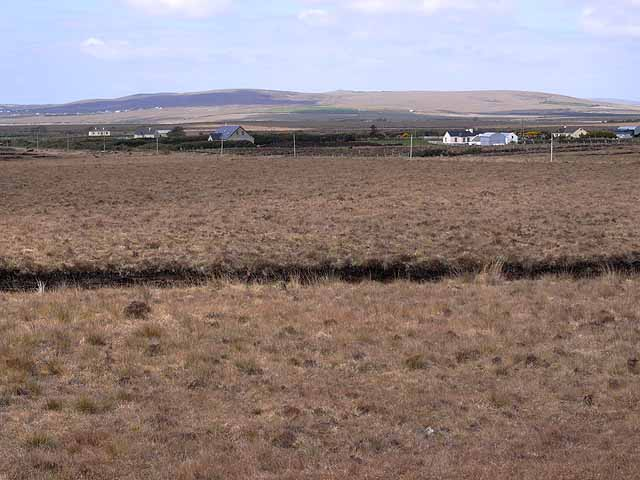
Peatbog at Glencullin Lower

Glencullen (or Glencullin) Lower is not heavily populated, with just 12 residents as of the 2011 census. However, in the 19th century it contained about 40 houses within a 2-mile (3.2 km) radius. In 1842, the road connecting Glencullen with Muingingaun was sanctioned and during the Public works for the Distress in 1847 the road from Glencullen to Bangor was laid, costing £150.

Glencullen (or Glencullin) Upper is a long, sheltered glen through which the Glencullen river flows down into Carrowmore Lake. At the top of the glen is Barnaglanna and Bouleyanlobane, usually called Buaile where in the past, "people from inside the Mullet came to graze their cattle in summer time".

Much of Glencullen was previously used as Buaile/booleying land. Glencullen was a meeting place of people from surrounding areas, and many Glencullen women married men from throughout Kilcommon parish.

A landslide disaster struck this townland on 22 February 1931 when Lough Boleynagee, a lake 516 feet (157 m) above sea level and overlooking Glencullen Upper, slid down the hillside, pushing mountains of soft bog in front of it. The landslide came down the river carrying with it the Glencullen Bridge. Lough Bouleynagee, a well known resting and feeding place for overwintering brent geese, was drained of all its water and on its bottom lay little but dead trout.

== Glencullen National School ==
The first mention of a hedge school in Glencullen was in 1826. Mary Shiels taught 22 pupils that year "in any available place" for a sum of £4 a year. The next mention of a school in Glencullen was in February 1862 when Friar Michael Munnelly applied for a teacher's salary and a supply of books for the newly built school, which was opened by him in November 1861. A few days after the request was made by Friar Michael Munnelly the school inspector, John Sweeney, reported: "There are 40 dwellings within half a mile of the school". This was enough to grant the requested salary and books.

At the turn of the 19th century, the stone and mortar school building was thatched and unplastered. It had one big room of 34 feet (10 m) by 18.5 feet (5.6 m) and 6.5 feet (2.0 m) high. John Sweeney, the inspector, reported that the school's teacher was Thomas Mc Nulty (1843–?). Mc Nulty's teaching ability was poor according to records, but no better could be found. Further in the report John Sweeney mentions:

"His (Thomas Mc Nulty) character is good and he governs the school well. His annual income is £4 by way of fees, some children are admitted by the teacher who cannot pay fees. There are no Protestants to be found within miles of the school. The people are farmers. They are poor. Of all the 37 pupils present today only 6 had been at school before. The school has been built about a quarter and a mile from any house along the roadside. The school will serve several villages. The district is populous. Unless the present school comes under the Board, many will be brought up without education, therefore I recommend the application. Owing to the untidy appearance of the place and the un-plastered state of the walls I recommend that the salary be granted on the condition that these defects be remedied before the 15th March."

The school fulfilled these conditions and was accepted by the Board of Education. It was given Roll No. 8884. The total number of pupils on the roll in 1862 is listed 83, although average attendance was 22. Thomas McNulty received £17 a year for his efforts and local contribution to the school was £2.13.0. Glencullen's national school was furnished with desksa book press and blackboard. A few years later (probably 1865) the school was struck off the roll. Friar Michael Munnelly managed to re-open the school in 1869 and this time it was given Roll no. 9803. The teacher from 1869 to 1874 was James Ruddy, an 18-year-old. For some unknown reason Roll no. 9803 was closed in 1874. After that, there is no mention again of Glencullen in the board's records until 1887. In 1887, there is a grant of £185 for Glencullen for the building of a new school on the same site as the previous ones to accommodate 60 pupils. The new school received roll no. 13331 and is opened in 1888.

In 1902, the principal teacher was J. Collins. The total number of pupils on roll no. 13331 for 1902 was 61, while average attendance was 37. Michael Henry is mentioned as a teacher here from 1909 to 1911. It was his first such position.

From 1903 to 1909, evening classes were taught. The class consisted of 22 men over 18 years that had to study two subjects. The annual teacher's grant for the evening class was £14.5.0. At the evening classes, newspapers were read and discussed and letters were written to distant relatives.

The schoolhouse is now a holiday home.
