= Carrowmore Lake =

Lake in County Mayo, Ireland

- Loch na Ceathrún Móire (Irish)
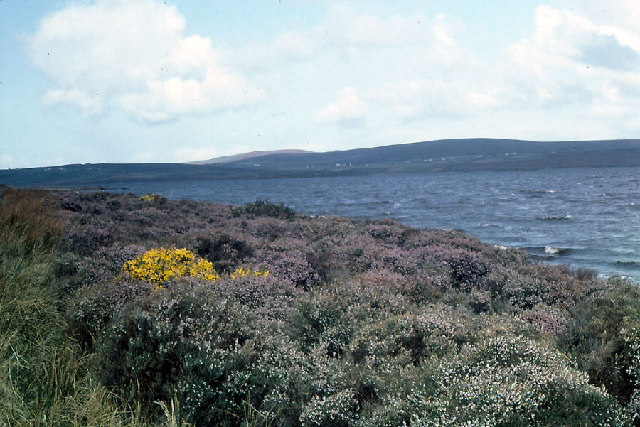
- Western shore of lake

- Location in Ireland
- Location: County Mayo, Connacht, Ireland
- Coordinates: 54°11′N 9°47′W, F836275
- Basin countries: Ireland
- Surface elevation: 128 metres (420 ft)

Carrowmore Lake (Irish: Loch na Ceathrún Móire) is situated in the parishes of Belmullet, Kiltane and Kilcommon Erris, County Mayo between the villages of Bangor Erris and Barnatra at the southern end of Broadhaven Bay. The freshwater lake is over 4 miles (6 km) long and almost 3 miles (5 km) wide at its widest point. Glencullen's two townlands line its eastern shore and Rathmorgan and the Knocknascollop mountains rise up along its western shores. Carrowmore is not a deep lake and it provides the drinking water for the whole of the Erris area. It is fed by the Carrowmore River and drains into the Owenmore River on its way to Blacksod Bay. The lake is designated as a S.P.A. (Birds directive) in E.U. law and also as 000476 Complex S.A.C. (Special Area of Conservation).

It is an oligotrophic/mesotrophic lake with a substrate of Dalradian schists and pale quartzite. Its shorelines are dominated by blanket bog mainly but there are many houses, mainly linear in layout, along both sides of its shores. Its catchment area includes the townland of Bellanaboy in Kilcommon where the contentious Corrib Gas refinery is situated.

== Archaeology ==
There are many islands in the lake. Some of these are thought to have been crannogs in use as lake fortifications through from the Iron Age to as late as the 17th century. The fort of Rathmorgan on the mountain at the south west corner of the lake is the site of the Táin Bó Flidhais cattle raid on Erris from Cruachan in Tulsk, County Roscommon, a tale from the Iron Age cycle of folklore.

George W. Russell ("Æ") wrote a poem about Carrowmore Lake.
