= Blacksod Bay Railway Terminus =

Unbuilt Irish railway terminus

Blacksod Bay railway terminus
- "Approaches to Blacksod Bay", an admiralty chart of Blacksod Bay from 1918
- Interactive map of the Blacksod Bay railway terminus area

General information
- Status: Never built
- Type: Railway terminus
- Location: Blacksod, Mullet Peninsula, County Mayo, Ireland
- Coordinates: 54.09801°N 10.05940°W

Design and construction
- Architects: E. B. Hoare and M. Wheeler

The Blacksod Bay railway terminus was a proposed railway terminus intended to have been constructed at the southernmost tip of the Mullet Peninsula, in Blacksod in County Mayo, Ireland in the first decades of the twentieth century. The large building was intended to serve as the main railway terminus for a proposed trans-atlantic ocean liner terminal that (if realised) would have collected passengers from the isolated peninsula and competed with the Port of Liverpool in England as the main embarkation point for North American-bound passengers. The catchment area for passengers was expected to include not only Ireland, but also Britain and Scandinavia too.

The ambitious project, if completed, would have resulted in a palatial terminus building situated in one of the most remote parts of Ireland, whilst remaining magnificent enough "to rival anything in Dublin or London".

== History ==
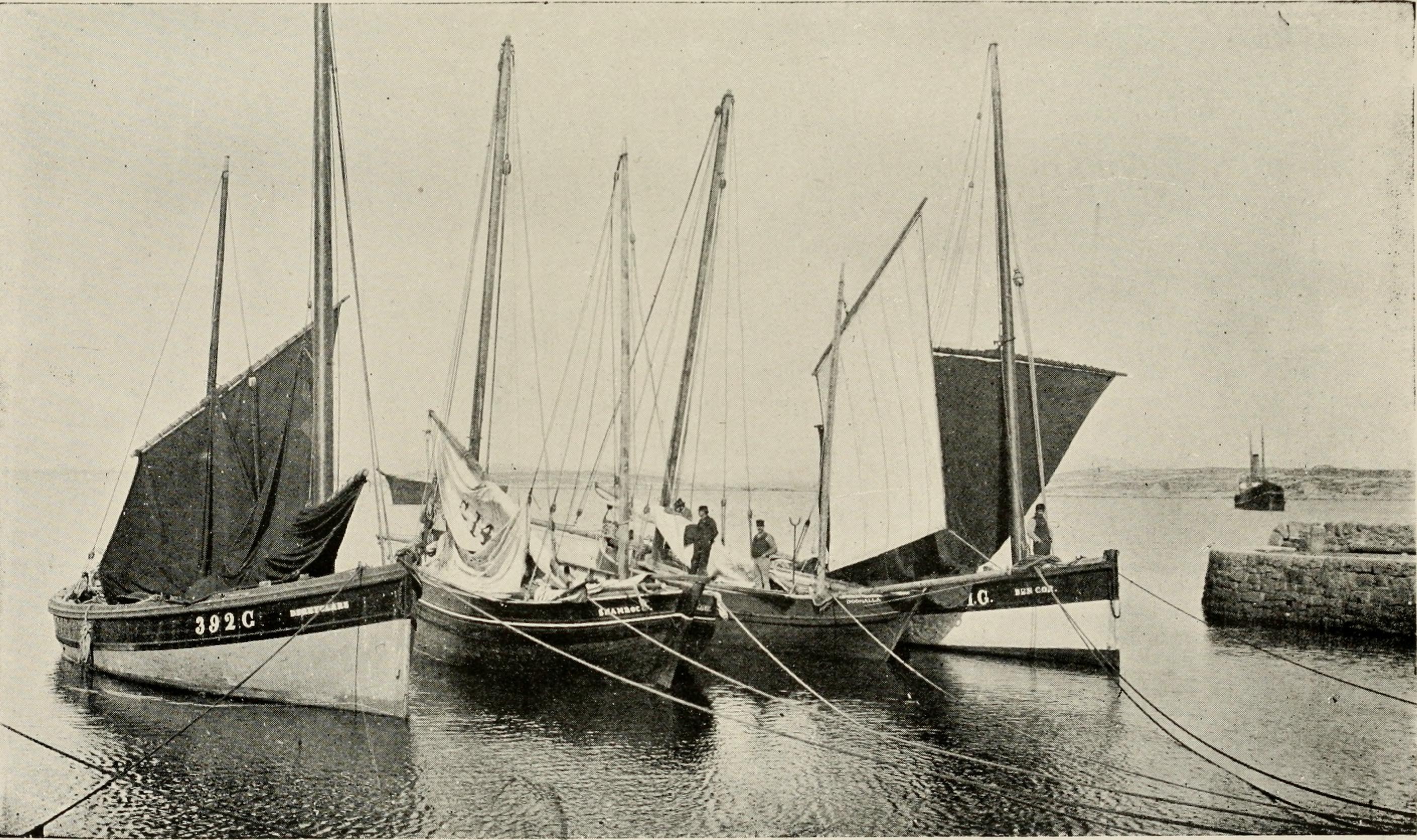
A newly opened mackerel fishery at Blacksod Bay in 1902

The economy of Blacksod was traditionally agriculturally based, including the fishing of mackerel.

In December 1902, it was noted that a county meeting had been held a week previously at Castlebar in County Mayo for the purposes of impressing upon the British and Canadian governments the claims of Blacksod Bay to be made the European port of call for a projected Canadian mail service.

On the front page of The Irish Times dated 20 February 1911, it was reported that amongst the items included on the program for the forthcoming Imperial Conference, the consideration "of schemes for linking up the various parts of the Empire by accelerated mail services of steamers across the Atlantic and Pacific Oceans", or "All-Red Route", would be included. The article added that "An integral part of any such scheme (was) likely to be the use of an Irish port in an accelerated service between Great Britain and Canada" and that two proposals were at that point before the public: for either making a terminus at Galway, or Blacksod Bay. At that point, the Galway scheme appeared to be "hung up", as explained by the chairman of the Midland Great Western Railway Company at a recent meeting, and it seemed that the Blacksod option would come before the Imperial Conference "in a more practical and material way" than the Galway option. The paper also reported that a Bill to incorporate a steamship company for service between Canada and Blacksod Bay was at that point presently before the Canadian Parliament.

In May 1911, it was reported that at the monthly meeting of the Dublin Corporation, a letter from the Galway Transatlantic Port Committee had been read out, asking for the Corporation to adopt a resolution in its favour. The letter stated that:

"...Galway is the most suitable port to connect with Halifax as terminus, and, if so arranged, with a Newfoundland port of call - (a) Being 230 miles nearer to London than is Blacksod by the proposed Blacksod route (via Larne and Stranraer), and only 71 miles further from Halifax. (b) Having a first-class existing railway (except for a few miles) through the centre of Ireland to Dublin, with easy connection with the North and South of Ireland, and a shorter and more direct connection with Belfast and Scotland than the proposed Blacksod route (Galway, being 194 miles from Belfast, and Blacksod 26 miles, while in the other scheme a new railway would have to be constructed from Blacksod to Collooney through a remote district, and the remaining part of the line to Larne in great part freed from curves and doubled, (c) Having an existing city beside the proposed harbour, (d) and the promise, at a reasonable cost, of one of the finest harbours in the world."

The rival claims of Galway and of Blacksod Bay were described by one journalist in another May 1911 article as having been "set forth with immense energy and ingenuity", adding that "their advocates (had) conducted a prolonged and spirited controversy in the newspapers"..."According as the advocate is a Galwegian or a Mayo-man, his native harbour is the best in the world, and the other a notorious death-trap". At the time of the articles publication on 10 May 1911, it was reported that the Blacksod scheme was at a more advanced stage than the Galway proposal, and that the Blacksod syndicate had succeeded in its attempt to obtain a Bill "to secure all necessary powers". However, it was noted that neither scheme had any definite prospect of receiving the approval - "an approval essential to success" - of the Imperial Conference, set to meet a fortnight hence, in London. The journalist warned that the inclusion of an Irish port was not absolutely essential to the completion of an 'All Red Route', and that if the "squabbling" continued between the two competing ports, the Conference could well "adopt the easiest solution of ignoring us (Ireland) altogether".

In an article dated 22 November 1913, it noted that at a recent meeting of the Midland Railway Company, both the directors and shareholders were strongly in favour of Galway as the location of the trans-atlantic port in the west. It was stated that in comparison with Blacksod, it (Galway) "possesses natural advantages as an Atlantic terminus, is already in direct communication with Dublin, and is on the quickest and shortest route to London".

The British government's focus was naturally directed towards World War I from 1914 onwards, and the scheme seems to have been sidelined.

== Architecture ==
In an extract from The Building News and Engineering Journal dated 13 Oct 1915, an artists' impression of the exterior and interior of the terminus was published, including descriptions of how the building would look:

"We give to-day an interior of the station hall or concourse, with an exterior perspective and plan, reduced, on a separate sheet, with the entrance elevation of this station, which has been designed to be built on a reef of rock projecting into Blacksod Bay, and to be a terminus for the Transatlantic traffic. The largest liners are able to berth at the end of this reef, which is the reason for the railway station being so placed. The construction of the building is intended to be carried out in reinforced concrete. The main feature is the concourse, which forms a waiting-place between the platforms and the harbour. The interior perspective shown by our double-page plate was included in the Royal Academy Exhibition this year. The architects are Messrs. E. B. Hoare and M. Wheeler FF.R.I.B.A. of Portman Street, Portman Square W." "Ionad Deirbhile", the visitor centre located in Blacksod, ran an exhibition on the Journal publication in July 2011.
