= Eileen Lynn Kato =

Irish academic, expert in Japanese poetry and theatre

- Born: 23 March 1932
- Died: 31 August 2008 (aged 76)

Academic background
- Education: Columbia University; University of Poitiers; Paris-Sorbonne University

Eileen Lynn Kato (23 March 1932 – 31 August 2008) was an Irish academic, translator and expert in Japanese poetry and theatre.

In 1991, she was appointed to the Japanese Imperial Household as a goyogakari (advisor), a post she held until 2007, shortly before her death. She was the first foreigner to hold such a position.

In addition to being an authority on Japanese poetry and theatre, and Waka art, she had a deep knowledge of Old-Middle English, Old Irish, Medieval French and Classical Japanese.

== Early life and education ==
Eileen Lynn was born in Bangor Erris on 23 March 1932, daughter of Jimmy Lynn from Briska, a townland just outside Bangor Erris, and Mary (née Tracy), originally from Galway. She attended the Ursuline Convent school in Sligo, and progressed to University College Galway, where in 1953 she secured a first class honours degree in French and Spanish.

In 1954 she won a scholarship from the French government, and attended the University of Poitiers, where she earned an MA, and then, having won a second scholarship, she attended the Sorbonne in Paris. When her husband was posted to the United Nations in New York during the 1960s, she completed a second MA, in Japanese Studies, at Columbia University, partly under the supervision of renowned scholar Donald Keene.

== Academic and cultural career ==
Kato's work primarily focused on translations mostly from Japanese to English. She also translated waka poems - Japan’s traditional poetic form - into Irish and English Irish poetry. Her work was included in several collections, including Twenty Plays of the Noh Theatre. She also wrote poetry, including waka.

While living in Japan, Kato developed an expertise in the Noh theatre - the classic form of Japanese dance and drama. She frequently attended the theatre and she counted many famous Noh actors as personal friends.

She also published a number of articles about Irish and Japanese literature in academic journals such as Monumenta Nipponica.

== Personal life ==
While in Poitiers, she met her husband, Yoshiya Kato, who was a Japanese diplomat serving in France. The marriage was only the second case since World War II in which a Japanese diplomat married a foreign national, and the marriage required the approval of the Ministry of Foreign Affairs. They lived in various locations including the US, China and Egypt, and conversed in French. Kato also became a Japanese citizen.

== Death ==
She died aged 76 on 31 August 2008. In a gesture reserved for those of outstanding merit and stature, the Emperor of Japan had a bowl of white roses placed by her portrait at her funeral in Tokyo.
