= Duvillaun =

Cluster of islands in Ireland

Coordinates: 54.07652°N 10.16654°W

Duvillaun (English: Black Island; Irish: Dubhoileán) is the name of a cluster of islands lying south to the Inishkea Islands and Inishglora in the Atlantic Ocean off the coast of North Mayo. The main island is known as Duvillaun More (Big Black Island). The other islands are known as Duvillaun Beg (Little Black Island), Turduvillaun, Shiraghy, Keely, Gaghta, and Leamareha.

The islands lie close to the coast of the Mullet Peninsula but in their geological type, they are composed of quartzite rock like that found on Achill Island and not like that of the Mullet off which it lies, which is composed largely of schists, slate, gneiss and white psammite with a granite deposit at Termon Hill near its southern end. Unlike its neighbouring islands of the Inishkeas and Inishglora, which are largely white sand and machair, blanket bog formed on Duvillaun. There is approx 180 acres (0.73 km^{2}) of grassland on Duvillaun Mor and about 70 acres (280,000 m^{2}) of grassland on Duvillaun Beg.

The islands were inhabited until the end of the 19th century when the inhabitants left to live on the mainland. They are now a bird sanctuary where many coastal birds can nest without human disturbance. Fulmars and kittiwakes nest on the cliffs, peregrine falcons hover, keeping a keen eye out for prey. Storm and Leach's petrels shelter amongst the abandoned buildings. Shags, cormorants, choughs and terns are also present.

Duvillaun Mor, which lies only a kilometer or so off Falmore at the southern tip of the Mullet Peninsula, has monastic remains which most likely date from the Early Christian period - i.e. 6th to 8th century AD, similar to the archaeological remains on Inishkea South and on Inishglora. There is a Gallerus-type oratory similar to that on Inishglora, a tomb with large stone slabs, one of which is six foot two inches tall and inscribed with a depiction of the crucifixion on its west side. There are also some beehive huts of a similar type to those on Inishglora. Unlike those on Inishglora, there is no 'saint' or religious house affiliated with the islands. The tomb is known as "Uaimh na Naoimh" ("The Saint's Tomb").
