= Lynott =

Lynott is a surname. Notable people with the surname include:

- James E. Lynott (1839–1890), Canadian political figure
- Phil Lynott (1949–1986), principal songwriter of Irish hard rock band Thin Lizzy
- Philomena Lynott (1930–2019), mother of Phil Lynott

== See also ==
- Linotte, a programming language
- Lynn Ott, American snowboarder
