= Darbiled =

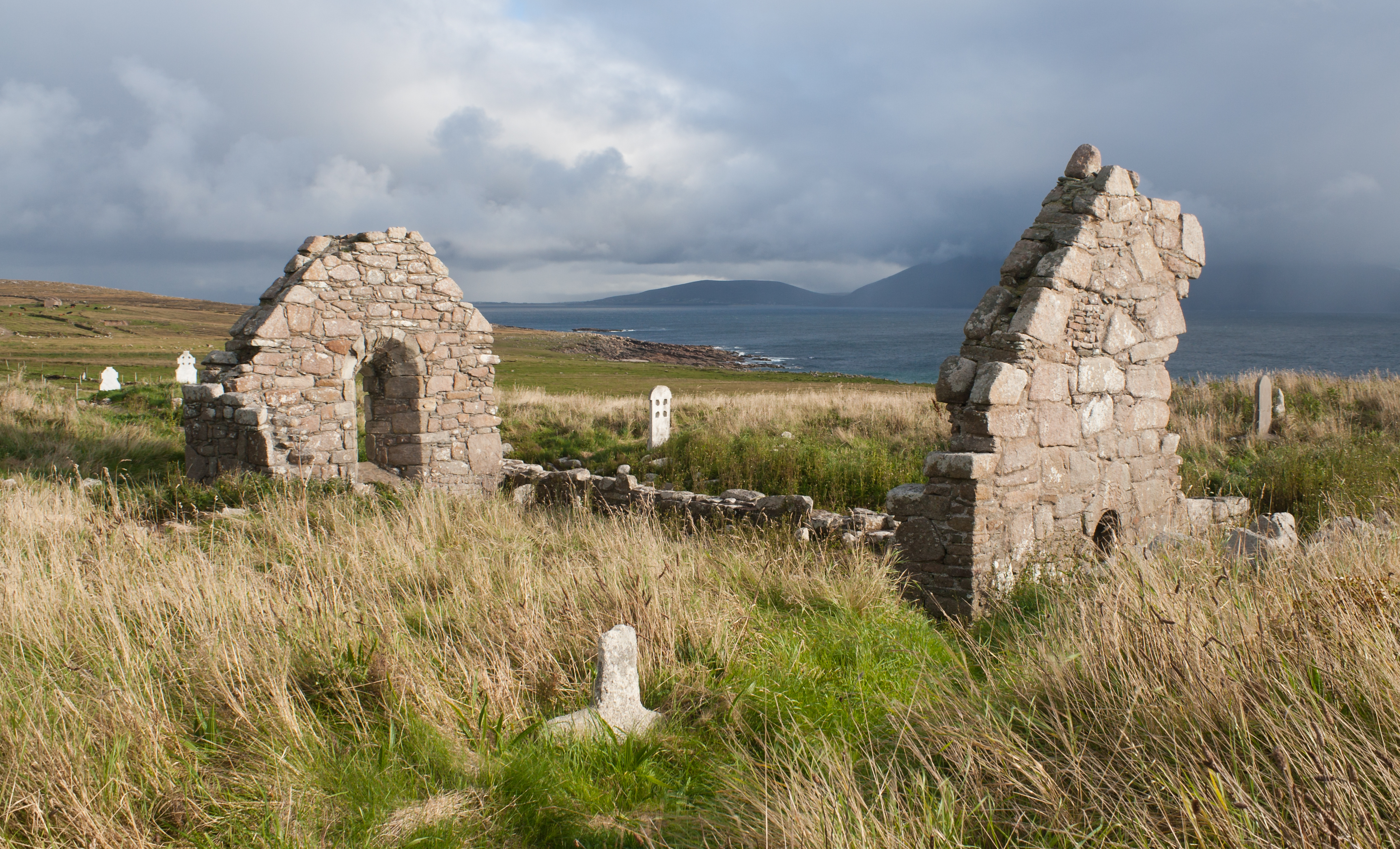
St. Dairbhile's Church, County Mayo, associated with Darbiled

Darbiled (Deirbhile, Dairbhile, Dervla) was an Irish anchoress and founder of Inis Cethig, fl. 575–600.

Darbiled is said to have been of the Ui Fiachrach dynasty of Connacht. Her father's name is given as Cormac mac Brecc, and had a brother called Triallach, also an ecclesiastic. The Book of Leinster names their mother as Cumman inion Dallbronach, claimed as the mother of some twenty saints, including Moninne of Armagh and Saint Senan.

She founded the hermitage of Inis Cethig on Erris in County Mayo. She appears to have lived in the time of Columba of Iona. She is commemorated in the martyrologies under 3 August and 16 October.
