= Owenmore River (County Mayo) =

River in Mayo, Ireland

Coordinates: 54.118034°N 9.578129°W

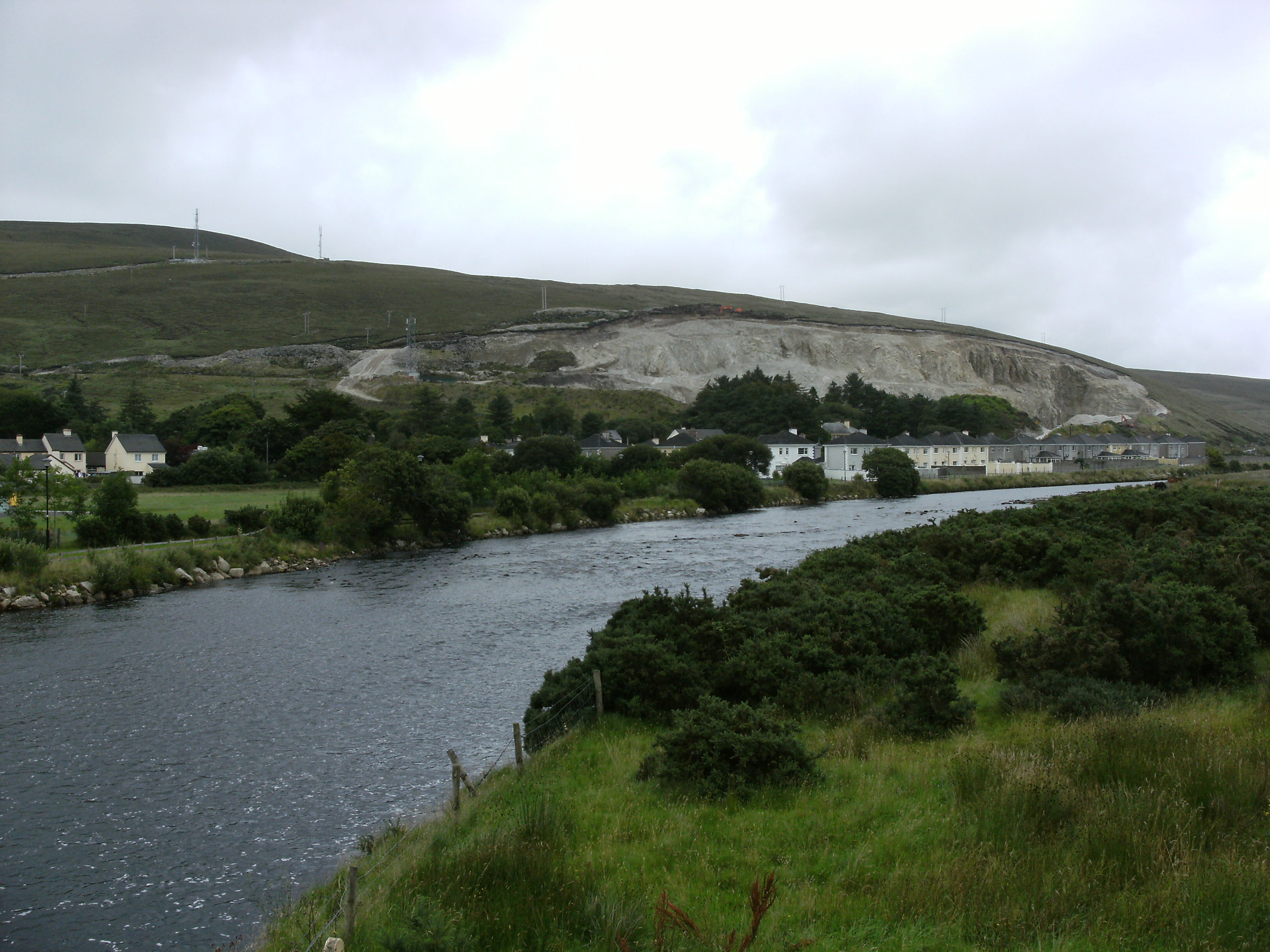
- Owenmore River passing through Bangor Erris
- Etymology: Irish for "big river"
- Native name: An Abhainn Mhór (Irish)

Location
- Country: Ireland
- Cities: Bangor Erris, Bellacorick

Physical characteristics
- Source
  - location: Nephin Beg Range, County Mayo
- Mouth
  - location: Atlantic Ocean via Tullaghan Bay
- Length: 47.07 kilometres (29.25 mi)
- Discharge
  - average: 14.7 m^{3}/s (520 cu ft/s)

Basin features
- Tributaries
  - right: Oweninny River

The Owenmore River (Irish: An Abhainn Mhór) is a river in northwest County Mayo, Ireland. It is big spate river and drains a large area of bogs, moorland and mountains.

== Course ==
The Owenmore River rises in the Nephin Beg Range, flowing first northwards to meet the Oweninny River, and continuing westwards through Bangor Erris before flowing out southwestwards through Tullaghan Bay into the Atlantic Ocean.

== Wildlife ==
The Owenmore River is a noted salmon, grilse and trout fishery.

== See also ==
- Rivers of Ireland
