= Linotte =

- Paradigm: object-oriented (prototype-based), structured, and imperative
- First appeared: 22 October 2005
- Stable release: 3.12 / 31 January 2022; 4 years ago
- License: GNU GPL
- Website: https://github.com/cpc6128/LangageLinotte langagelinotte.free.fr at the Wayback Machine (archived 2023-11-01)

Linotte is an interpreted 4th generation programming language. Linotte's syntax is in French.

Linotte is intentionally simple, as the language's goal is to allow French-speaking people and especially children with little experience in computer science to easily learn programming, with the slogan (in French) "you know how to read a book, so you can write a computer program".

== Vocabulary ==
Linotte uses a non-technical vocabulary derived from common French use. Its terms are closer to those used in film or literature, with a program being a book, a variable being an actor, and the screen a canvas. Instead of executing a book, it is read.

The function body starts at French: début, lit. 'start'. Keywords that in other languages might be named things "print" or "log" in Linotte are named things like affiche, 'display':

Similarly, a program can demande, or ask, to prompt the user to enter a value.

=== A book in linotte ===
A book is the backbone of a program written in Linotte, and is represented by a file with the extension « .liv ». The first function in a book is the first one read in the book.

=== Actors and roles ===
To give a certain value a tag or name, one creates an instance of the value in memory, called an actor. Each actor is an object consisting of a value, a name and a role (a type).

The roles in Linotte are:

- nombre, 'number'
- texte, 'string'
- drapeau, 'flag' (boolean)
- casier, 'array'
- espèce, 'class'.

=== Actions ===
An action in Linotte constitutes a verb and one or ore actors. Here are some examples:

demande acteur

acteur vaut 5 * 5

affiche acteur

== Example codes ==
=== Hello, World ===
 BonjourLeMonde :
   début
     affiche "Hello, world!"

=== Programming paradigms Linotte supports ===
==== Imperative programming ====
This paradigm was the first to be implemented and is quick and easy to understand.

spaghetti :
 début
   affiche "I am here."
   va vers second

second :
  début
   affiche "Now I am here!"

Here is an example of the fib function using parameters:

 Fibonacci : 
  a est un nombre
  début
   questionne a sur "Enter a number:" 
   affiche fib(a)
 
 nombre fib : 	
  * n est un nombre 	
  début
   si n est < 2, retourne n 		
   retourne fib(n-1) + fib(n-2)

==== Object oriented programming ====
French: espèces, lit. 'classes' are a relatively complex but powerful type. Here is an example:

espèces
 foot est un nombre
 color est un texte
 meal est un texte
 espèce animal contient foot, color, meal
 
main :
 cat est un animal, foot vaut 4, color vaut "black", meal vaut "mouse"
 début
  affiche meal de cat

==== Event driven programming ====
Events are attached to graphical components when building a HCI:

globale      
 form est un formulaire, titre vaut "The text box", largeur vaut 400, hauteur vaut 260         
 box est une boite, x vaut 30, y vaut 30, largeur vaut 200, hauteur vaut 100         
 b1 est un bouton, texte vaut "Display text in the table", x vaut 30, y vaut 150         
 l1 est une étiquette, texte vaut "", x vaut 30, y vaut 200         		 

principale :
 début
  ajoute box & b1 & l1 dans form		         
  Fais réagir b1 à "clic souris" pour afficher valeur 		
  tant que 1 != 2, lis 			
   temporise	 		
  ferme  

afficher valeur :
 *b est un bouton 	
 début
  affiche texte de boite 		
  reviens

=== Parallel execution ===
traitements asynchrone :
 début
  appelle traitement 		
  affiche "Wait 3 seconds" 		
  attends 3 secondes 		
  affiche "End of 3 seconds" 		

traitement :
 début
  attends 1 seconde 		
  affiche "I do not want to wait!" 		
  reviens  

=== Dynamic web pages development ===
From version 1.2.2 onwards, the concept of weblivre was introduced. It mixes in the same file HTML and Linotte. The latter is integrated into the HTML in a similar style as PHP or Java.

<%action est un ''texte'' %>
<%n est un ''nombre'' %>
<%duration est un ''nombre'' %>
<html>
<head><title>Suite de Syracuse en ligne</title></head>
<body>
<h1>Suite de Syracuse :</h1>
<% 
   demande action 
   si action == "resultat", lis 
      demande n 
      tant que n > 1, lis
		duration vaut duration + 1
		si (n mod 2) == 0, n vaut n / 2
		sinon, n vaut n * 3 + 1
	  ferme		
%>
    The duration of the flight is <%affiche duration%>
    <form action="syracuse.wliv" method="post">
	  <input type="submit" value="Recommencer" />
    </form>	
<% 
   ferme 
   sinon, lis 
%> 
    <form action="syracuse.wliv" method="post">
	  <input type="hidden" name="action" value="resultat" />
	  ''nombre'' de départ : <input type="texte" name="n"  />
	  <input type="submit" value="Calculer la durée" />
    </form>
<% 
   ferme 
%>
</body>
</html>

== The Linotte interpreter ==
Linotte is an interpreted language. For now there only exists one available interpreter, free to use. The interpreter is developed in Java with its source code licensed GNU-GPL. There likewise exists versions on Windows, Ubuntu Linux, Fedora Linux, Arch Linux and Framakey USB sticks.

== Webonotte ==
The Webonotte is a HTTP server integrated at l'Atelier Linotte based on Jetty. It produces dynamic web pages programmed in Linotte language.
