= Aughleam =

Village in County Mayo, Ireland

An Eachléim English: Aghleam or Aughleam
- Village
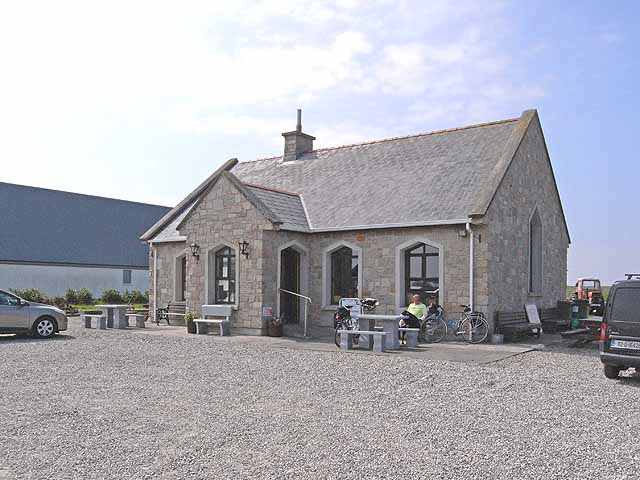
- Eachléim Heritage Centre

- Location in Ireland
- Coordinates: 54°06′57″N 10°06′08″W
- Country: Ireland
- Province: Connacht
- County: County Mayo
- Elevation: 1 m (3.3 ft)
- Irish Grid Reference: F625205
- Eachléim is the only official name. The anglicized spellings Aughleam and Aghleam have no official status.

An Eachléim, anglicized as Aughleam or Aghleam, is a Gaeltacht village and townland in County Mayo, Ireland. It lies on the Mullet Peninsula in Erris, and the nearest town is Belmullet, 14 km to the north (17 km by the R313 road). It has a total area of 2.96 km^{2} (1.14 sq mi). Its name derives from Irish Each (horse) and Léim (leap), as local folklore has it a horse leapt from the east of the townland to the west, marking out its borders.

== Heritage sites ==
The village's heritage centre, Ionad Deirbhile, aims to give visitors an insight into the lifestyle of the Mullet Peninsula in the past. Also included is information on St. Deirbhile whose relics can be seen in the surrounding area. The heritage centre has locally gathered research history materials, which visitors can use to research local history and archaeology, island life and the Legend of the Children of Lir. While the heritage centre is relatively newly built, it was built to suit the area in the form of a traditional cottage. A 10-foot stained glass window illustrating the story of St. Deirbhile is a feature of the centre. It is a replica of the window found in the pre-Norman Church as Falmore.

The sixth-century St. Deirbhile's Church is situated on the peninsula. St Deirbhile's well, a short distance away, is a holy well.

== See also ==
- Connacht Irish
- List of towns and villages in Ireland
- Wild Atlantic Way
