= Inishkea Islands =

Islands of the Mayo coast in Ireland

Coordinates: 54.1333°N 10.2°W

The Inishkea Islands (Irish: Inis Gé) are situated off the coast of the Belmullet peninsula in County Mayo in Ireland. They are believed to be named after a saint that lived there, called Saint Kea. There are two main islands – Inishkea North and Inishkea South.

In the 19th century, the islands were notable for the pagan religious traditions practised there. One tradition involved a small terracotta statue of a god or goddess known as the Godstone, or Naomhóg in Irish, which was worshipped as an idol. It is possible that the remoteness of the islands somehow preserved some form of pre-Christian worship. In the early 1900s, the islands were populated by more than 300 people, who were monolingual Irish speakers, but the island gradually depopulated after 10 fishermen drowned at sea during a fierce storm in October 1927. Two people live on the island now, but the population increases to about fifteen from May to September.

Locator map of Inishkea North

Locator map of Inishkea South

== History ==
=== Traditional leadership and population (1843) ===
A report from 1843 written by Irish Protestant Robert Jocelyn, stated that the islanders maintained traditional Gaelic leadership. William Makepeace reported a king or “chief” named Cain, an intelligent peasant who acted as the informal leader, and that settlement of all disputes referred to his decision. Makepeace wrote that there were around 380 people who lived on the island, all who spoke Gaelic.

=== Maritime tragedies and economic industries ===
The Inishkea Islands were historically reliant on maritime activities such as fishing, whaling, and turf cutting. These industries, while vital to the islanders' livelihoods, exposed them to the perilous conditions of the Atlantic Ocean, leading to numerous accidents and losses.

The islands’ rugged coastline and exposure to the Atlantic made them a site for frequent shipwrecks. Historical accounts and local oral tradition note that islanders were often involved in salvaging goods from wrecked vessels, both to supplement their subsistence and as a reflection of their maritime resilience.

The combination of whaling, turf cutting, and exposure to violent storms made the Inishkea Islands a particularly hazardous environment for their inhabitants, shaping both their economic practices and local cultural memory.

==== 1927 storm tragedy ====
On 28 October 1927, a sudden and violent storm struck the western seaboard of Ireland, resulting in the loss of 45 lives at sea. Ten fishermen from the Inishkea Islands were among the victims, including a 14-year-old boy, Terry Reilly, and his father.

The storm caught the fishermen off guard, as conditions had been calm earlier in the day. The tragedy devastated the island community, contributing to the eventual abandonment of the islands in the 1930s.

==== Whaling industry ====
In the early 20th century, a Norwegian whaling station operated on Rusheen Island, a tidal islet off Inishkea South, between 1908 and 1914. This station was part of a broader Norwegian effort to exploit whale populations off the Irish coast during a period when Norway had imposed a temporary ban on whaling in their own waters.

The whaling operations required islanders to venture into the open Atlantic in small boats (curraghs), making them highly vulnerable to sudden storms. While specific records of shipwrecks related to whaling activities on the Inishkea Islands are limited, the inherent dangers of the industry contributed to the maritime hazards faced by the islanders.

==== Turf cutting and transportation ====
Turf cutting, or peat harvesting, was a crucial economic activity. Islanders transported cut turf by boat to the mainland for use as fuel. Small boats and currachs were frequently at the mercy of strong Atlantic winds and rough seas, leading to accidents, capsizing, or the loss of both people and resources.

==== Piracy ====
In the mid 1800s, numerous instances of piracy occurred from the shores of Inishkea. The Mullet region was ravaged by the potato famine, but the population of the Inishkea islands kept rising.

The Inishkea islanders reportedly carried out piracy primarily using currachs to intercept cargo vessels off the coast. They would sometimes throw stones to force crew members below deck and seize supplies such as flour and meal.

This activity was largely a response to extreme deprivation during the Great Famine, rather than profit-driven piracy. Large numbers of islanders sometimes coordinated raids along Broadhaven and Blacksod Bay, exploiting their knowledge of local currents and hidden coves.

Coastguard records indicate that surveillance and occasional patrols gradually curtailed these raids, although oral tradition preserved stories of their boldness for decades. The practice is now remembered in local folklore as a testament to the islanders’ resilience in the face of famine and isolation.

== Archaeology and early Christian history ==
Archaeological evidence indicates that the Inishkea Islands have been occupied since at least the Neolithic period (circa 3500‑2000 BC). On Inishkea North, there are remains of burial mounds known locally as the Baileys, Bailey Mór, Bailey Beag, and Bailey Dóite, as well as ruins of megalithic tombs along the northeast coast.

By the 6th century AD, the islands had become centers of Christian monastic activity. Excavations by Françoise Henry uncovered beehive huts, cross‑slabs dating to the late 7th and 8th centuries, and a small church dedicated to St. Colmcille (St. Columba) on the southwest part of Inishkea North.

On Inishkea South there are several cross‑slabs and pillars. One particular slab to the north of the harbor is set in the center of two stone circles; heritage sources suggest this may have begun as a pre‑Christian site later “Christianised.”

Françoise Henry's journals also suggest that the monastic community was involved in crafts, notably a workshop that produced purple dye from dog whelk shells, likely used for manuscript illumination.

=== Pagan religion and The Godstone ===
The evangelical Irish Protestant Robert Jocelyn wrote the following about the unusual religious practices of the islands' inhabitants in 1851:

"...save during the few and necessarily short visits of the clergyman of the parish, seldom have they heard of eternal life as the free gift of God through Jesus Christ, and even these visits were unprofitable from their total ignorance of English... their worship consists in occasional meetings at their chief's house, with visits to a holy well, called in their native tongue, Derivla... Here the absence of religion is filled with the open practice of Pagan idolatry... In the South Island, in the house of a man named Monigan, a stone idol, called in the Irish 'Neevougi' has been from time immemorial religiously preserved and worshipped. This god in appearance resembles a thick roll of home-spun flannel, which arises from the custom of dedicating a dress of that material to it, whenever its aid is sought; this is sewed on by an old woman, its priestess, whose peculiar care it is."

In 1940 English author T. H. White visited the islands and learned the tale of what called the "Neevougi" (probably Naomhóg, roughly translating to "little saint"). White wrote that the inhabitants of the islands credited the stone with calming weather, speeding the growth of potatoes, and quelling fire, but that it had allegedly been cast into the sea in the 1890s by one Fr. O'Reilly. White's discoveries - which include encounters with pirates, the theft of the stone from North to South Inishkea by islanders jealous of its potato-growing properties, a thrice (or once) annual ceremony where the stone was re-"clothed" in new cloth, and the niche in the wall of a south Inishkea hut where the Naomhóg had formerly resided - are recorded in his book, which was based upon his contemporary journal.

=== Godstone and Folklore ===
Beyond the eyewitness accounts of Jocelyn and White, a wider body of folklore describes the powers of the Godstone. Island tradition held that the idol protected currachs during dangerous sea crossings, and it was sometimes carried on voyages to ensure safe passage. It was also invoked in cases of illness, with at least one narrative crediting a recovery to its presence.

The stone was credited with agricultural powers, especially the growth of potatoes. Rivalry between North and South Inishkea was said to have led to its theft by one community from the other, in hopes of improving harvests. The idol was ceremonially “re-clothed” in homespun flannel, a role overseen by an elderly female caretaker often described as its priestess.

Accounts of the stone's fate differ. Some maintain that Fr. O’Reilly destroyed it in the late 19th century, while others suggest it was hidden or secretly preserved. In any case, by the early 20th century it had vanished, surviving only in oral tradition and later folklore studies.

Folklorists note that the Naomhóg is unusual as a portable ritual object, since Irish sacred practice more often centers on fixed sites such as holy wells or rag trees. Catholic clergy condemned it as a survival of pre-Christian belief, and modern scholars interpret it as both a remnant of older ritual and a distinctive adaptation in a remote island community.

Although lost, the Godstone remains a recurring subject in modern folklore collections and anthropological studies, often cited as a symbol of cultural survival on the Atlantic fringe and of the eventual decline of the Inishkea community.

== Flora and fauna ==
The islands are also home to a number of bird species- the geese of the island's name are barnacle geese. In addition, the islands have wheatears, rock pipits and fulmars. Lapwing breed on the island and peregrine falcons hunt for prey. There is evidence of rabbits on the island. The islands have no trees and are composed almost entirely of machair with outcrops of rock. They are crisscrossed by a number of stone walls that provide some shelter for nesting birds.
