= Henry Coyle (boxer) =

Irish boxer

Personal information
- Nickname: Western Warrior
- Nationality: Irish
- Born: 8 July 1982 (age 43) Geesala, County Mayo, Ireland
- Height: 5 ft 10 in (178 cm)
- Weight: Light middleweight

Boxing career
- Stance: Orthodox

Boxing record
- Total fights: 21
- Wins: 19
- Win by KO: 12
- Losses: 2
Medal record
Men's amateur boxing
Irish National Championships
Bronze medal – third place	2003 Dublin	Welterweight
Gold medal – first place	2004 Dublin	Welterweight
Bronze medal – third place	2005 Dublin	Welterweight
Representing Ireland
World Military Championships
Bronze medal – third place	2002 The Curragh	Light-middleweight
Gold medal – first place	2005 Pretoria	Welterweight

Henry Coyle (born 8 July 1982) is an Irish former professional boxer who competed from 2007 to 2013. As an amateur, he won the Irish welterweight championship in 2003.

== Amateur career ==
Coyle boxed as an amateur winning the Irish welterweight title in 2003 after beating James Moore in the final at the National Boxing Stadium in Dublin.

In July 2006, Coyle won gold in boxing at the World Military Games in South Africa.

== Professional career ==
Coyle made his professional debut on 16 March 2007 at Madison Square Garden in New York City, beating American Jason Collazo by a knockout (KO) in the first round. Coyle's second fight was a first-round technical knockout (TKO) victory against Samuel Ortiz Gomez at the Beacon Theatre on 18 May 2007. The following month, Coyle's third fight was against undefeated Omar Bell at the Hammerstein Ballroom. Coyle was knocked down, which was the first time Coyle had suffered a knockdown in his career. Before the fight was officially stopped, handing Coyle his first career loss, at just 29 seconds in the first round. On 14 September 2007, in his first fight back following the loss to Bell, Coyle stopped Robert Kimbrough by a first-round TKO. On 16 November 2007 at the Cicero Stadium in Cicero, Illinois, Coyle defeated Guy Packer by TKO in the first round.

On 15 November 2009, Coyle returned to the Breafy House in Castlebar County Mayo to make his Irish debut live on RTÉ on the undercard of Bernard Dunne fight against Cristian Faccio. Henry Coyle went the distance before receiving the referee's decision in overcoming Sergejs Savrinovics (who had lost all of his previous fights), the score cards read 78–74.

Coyle was subsequently defeated by knockout in the third round of his fight against Neil Sinclair, at the Odyssey Arena in Belfast.

Coyle claimed the vacant WBF Light Middleweight title at the Royal Theatre in Castlebar on 12 August 2011, when he beat Italy's Elio Cotena on a technical knockout. Coyle had been on top, winning each of the preceding rounds, and then in the fifth Cotena sustained an extremely deep cut just above his eye after clashing with Coyle's head and the Italian's doctor intervened.

== Professional boxing record ==
21 fights	19 wins	2 losses
By knockout	12	2
By decision	7	0

No.	Result	Record	Opponent	Type	Round, time	Date	Location	Notes
21	Win	19–2	Skylar Thompson	UD	6	6 Dec 2013	UIC Pavilion, Chicago, Illinois, US	
20	Win	18–2	Marcelo Alejandro Rodriguez	UD	12	17 Aug 2012	Royal Theatre, Castlebar, Ireland	Retained WBF (Foundation) light-middleweight title
19	Win	17–2	Damon Antoine	UD	8	21 Jun 2012	The Belvedere, Elk Grove, Illinois, US	
18	Win	16–2	Elio Cotena	TD	5 (12), 3:00	12 Aug 2011	Royal Theatre, Castlebar, Ireland	Won vacant WBF (Foundation) light-middleweight title
17	Win	15–2	Keith Collins	TKO	2 (6), 2:22	18 May 2011	Donald E. Stephens Convention Center, Rosemont, Illinois, US	
16	Win	14–2	William Prieto	TKO	6 (6), 2:42	9 Apr 2011	Horseshoe Casino, Hammond, Indiana, US	
15	Win	13–2	Sandor Ramocsa	PTS	8	20 Nov 2010	Breaffy House Resort, Castlebar, Ireland	
14	Win	12–2	Mustafah Johnson	UD	6	2 Oct 2010	Horseshoe Casino, Hammond, Indiana, US	
13	Win	11–2	Marcus Luck	RTD	2 (8), 0:01	29 May 2010	Horseshoe Casino, Hammond, Indiana, US	
12	Loss	10–2	Neil Sinclair	TKO	3 (10), 0:22	15 May 2009	Odyssey Arena, Belfast, Northern Ireland	For vacant Irish light-middleweight title
11	Win	10–1	Dave Saunders	TKO	2 (8), 0:41	27 Mar 2009	UIC Pavilion, Chicago, Illinois, US	
10	Win	9–1	Sergejs Savrinovics	PTS	8	15 Nov 2008	Breaffy House Resort, Castlebar, Ireland	
9	Win	8–1	Allan Moore	KO	1 (4), 1:29	2 Aug 2008	U.S. Steel Yard, Gary, Indiana, US	
8	Win	7–1	Ben Aragon	TKO	3 (8), 1:18	9 May 2008	Cicero Stadium, Cicero, Illinois, US	
7	Win	6–1	Rashaan Abdul Blackburn	TKO	5 (6), 1:14	26 Feb 2008	Pepsi Coliseum, Indianapolis, Indiana, US	
6	Win	5–1	Chris Cook	TKO	3 (6), 1:33	31 Jan 2008	The Plex, North Charleston, South Carolina, US	
5	Win	4–1	Guy Packer	TKO	1 (4), 1:46	16 Nov 2007	Cicero Stadium, Cicero, Illinois, US	
4	Win	3–1	Robert Kimbrough	TKO	1 (4), 1:44	14 Sep 2007	Hilton Hotel, Huntington, New York, New York, US	
3	Loss	2–1	Omar Bell	TKO	1 (4), 0:29	20 Jun 2007	Hammerstein Ballroom, New York City, New York, US	
2	Win	2–0	Samuel Ortiz Gomez	TKO	1 (4), 0:48	18 May 2007	Beacon Theatre, New York City, New York, US	
1	Win	1–0	Jason Collazo	KO	1 (4), 1:34	16 Mar 2007	Madison Square Garden, New York City, New York, US	

Sporting positions
Amateur boxing titles
Previous: James Moore	Irish welterweight champion 2004	Next: Karl Brabazon
Minor world boxing titles
Vacant Title last held by Bongani Mwelase	WBF (Foundation) light middleweight champion 12 August 2011 – September 2013; Vacated	Vacant Title next held by Daniel Dawson
