= Geesala =

Village in County Mayo, Ireland

Geesala Gaoth Sáile Gweesalia
- Village
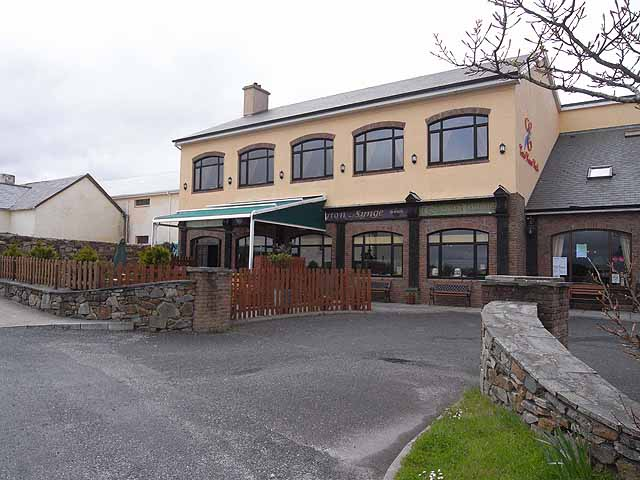
- John Millington Synge bar in Geesala

- Location in Ireland
- Coordinates: 54°06′45″N 9°53′57″W
- Country: Ireland
- Province: Connacht
- County: County Mayo

Geesala or Gweesalia (in Irish, and officially, Gaoth Sáile) is a small Gaeltacht village in County Mayo, Ireland. It is on the Gweesalia peninsula in the electoral division of Rathhill, in the civil parish of Kilcommon, in the historical barony of Erris in the west of the county.

The village has a general store, pub, community centre (that contains a boxing club and cafe), post office, St Columkille's Catholic Church, playground and a hotel.

== History ==
=== Built heritage ===
Evidence of ancient settlement in the area include a ringfort and several reputed crannog sites in the neighbouring townlands of An Ráith, Tulachán Dubh and Dumha Locha. Within the village itself, the local Catholic church was designed by architect Ralph Henry Byrne and opened in 1932.

=== Synge connection ===
John Millington Synge's play, The Playboy of the Western World is reputedly set in the area, and its first act is based in a fictional shebeen (unlicensed pub) in Geesala. The play's "savage hero" is partially based on a man convicted of assaulting a woman on Achill Island in 1894, the details of which were recounted to Synge while on the Aran Islands.

== Transport ==
There are three bus routes serving the village, linking it to the neighbouring towns and villages including Belmullet and Ballina, 452 and 496 operated by McGrath coaches and 946 operated by Corduff Travel. Both providers operate on behalf of Transport for Ireland.

== Sport ==
Geesala National School has won several county titles in Gaelic football and a number of former pupils have represented Mayo at minor, U-21 and senior levels. The village's boxing club has produced such boxers as Henry Coyle and Jimmy Monaghan, with some of its students achieving world titles in lightweight and bantamweight divisions.

== See also ==
- List of towns and villages in Ireland
