= Glencastle =

Village in County Mayo, Ireland

Glencastle Gleann Chaisil
- Townland
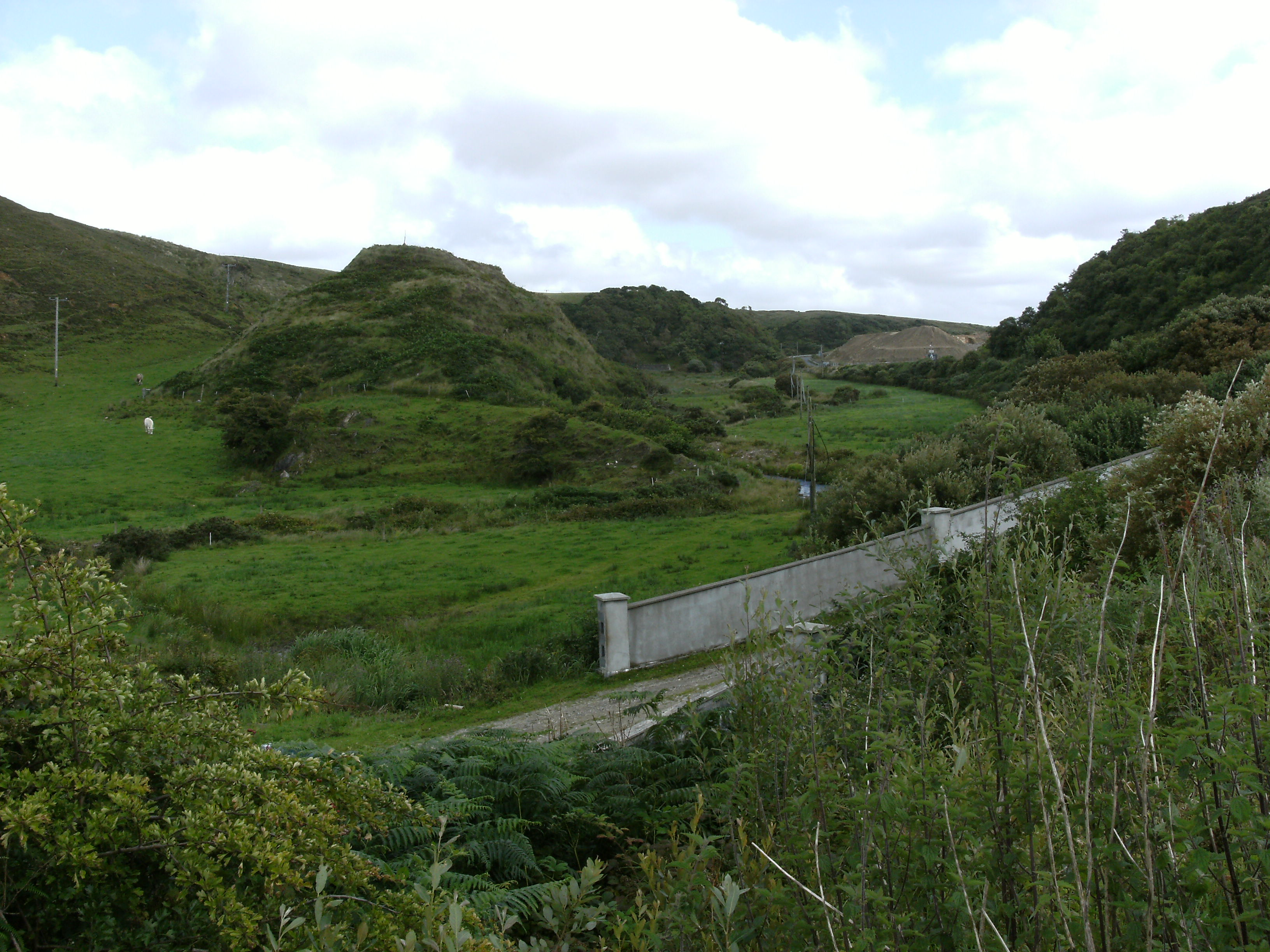
- Dún Domhnaill fort in Glencastle townland

- Location in Ireland
- Coordinates: 54°11′N 9°53′W
- Country: Ireland
- Province: Connacht
- County: County Mayo

Population (2011)
  - Total: 38
- (Glencastle townland only)

Glencastle (Irish: Gleann Chaisil) is a small village, electoral division and townland in the northwest of County Mayo, Ireland. The townland of Glencastle has an area of approximately 2,337 acres (9.46 km^{2}).

== Topography ==
Glencastle is a mountain valley which was once known as the gateway to the Mullet Peninsula. In the middle of this glen stands an ancient fort called "Dun Donnell" or the fort of Domhnall. Domhnall was, according to legend, of the Gamanraige tribe and an ascendant of Ailill Finn, the husband of Flidhais, and involved in the tale of Táin Bó Flidhais. As part of the cycle of Celtic folklore and legends, Domhnall used to close the gates of Erris at night levying tolls on passers-by.

The remains of this fortification are now three large mounds which have never been archaeologically investigated. There are views of Broadhaven Bay and Blacksod Bay from where the fort would have stood.

== History ==
The O'Caithnaidhs, who were chiefs of Erris before the Norman Invasion in the 12th century, had their stronghold in Glencastle. They were defeated by the O'Connors who then took over the fort until 1303 when it was conquered by the Anglo-Norman Barrett family. By 1540, the Barrett's castle in Glencastle was so well known that the English called Erris 'Irrus Domnann', in a variation of the Irish name for the castle. For the next two hundred years, the Barretts held lands in the area, and attained various positions including as Bishop of Elphin, and Baron of Irrus.

There are a number of earlier archaeological monuments recorded in Glencastle townland, including several ring forts and cairn sites. A number of other megalithic structures were destroyed in the 19th century, including one, described by engineer Patrick Knight as a "Druidical altar" or "cromlech", which was demolished during the construction of the Belmullet/Bangor road in the 1820s.

Thomas Johnson Westropp, an antiquarian who visited the Erris area in the early 20th century, wrote the following of Glencastle in 1912:

"It is a beautiful spot, especially after the dreary drive through barren moors from Crossmolina through Bangor. We suddenly dip into a stream runnel and, without preparation drop into a lovely wooded glen, at first so narrow that there is barely room for the road and the brook; we pass a regular brown dyke of volcanic rock and a thickly-wooded hillside, hovered over by hawks, and reach the more open valley, the 'Gates of Erris'. In its centre a grassy moat-like mass of rock was upheaved by some remote eruption. The east face is covered with hazels and birch, the upper trees growing out of the side to keep the shelter of the fort rising over 90 feet above the stream. To the north, a great mountain swells up for 760 feet facing the glen and its keeper. A second mound, like an overturned boat lies further down the valley"
