= Blacksod Bay =

Bay of the Atlantic Ocean in Erris, Ireland

- Cuan an Fhóid Duibh (Irish)
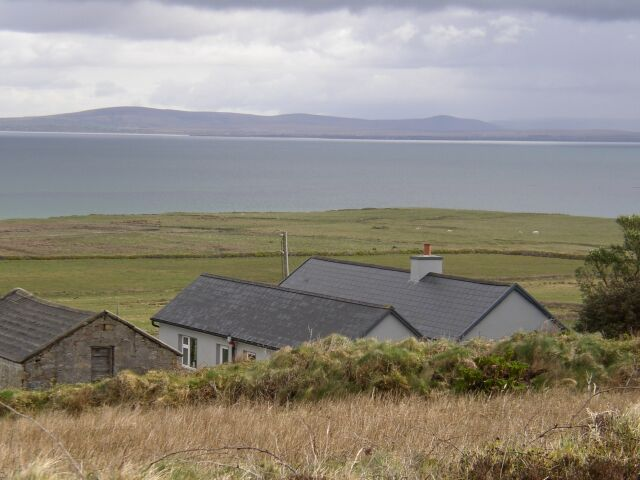
- Bay from the Mullet Peninsula

- Location in Ireland
- Location: County Mayo, Ireland
- Coordinates: 54.12°N 10.03°W
- Ocean/sea sources: Atlantic Ocean
- Max. length: 16 kilometres (10 mi)
- Max. width: 8 km (5 mi)

Ramsar Wetland
- Official name: Blacksod Bay and Broadhaven
- Designated: 7 June 1996
- Reference no.: 844

Blacksod Bay (Irish: Cuan an Fhóid Duibh) is a bay of the Atlantic Ocean in Erris, north County Mayo, Ireland. The 16 km (9.9 mi) long and 8 km (5.0 mi) wide bay is bounded on its western side by the Mullet Peninsula. Its eastern side includes Kiltane Parish, which extends southwards from Belmullet towards Gweesalia and Doohoma.

== Geography ==
Blacksod Bay, which contains many little islets, opens to the Atlantic Ocean. The granite found in this area as most of the rest of the substrate consists of ancient gneiss and schist. The Mullet peninsula is covered with fairly flat sand dunes. Blacksod Bay is wide at its mouth and is a safe place for anchorage.

At its northern end, Blacksod Bay is connected to Broadhaven Bay by an 18th-century canal through Belmullet.

== Lighthouses ==
Blacksod Lighthouse, which was completed in 1862, occupies the southern end of the Mullet Peninsula. It was built from locally cut granite taken from the quarry at Termon Hill. It is famously the lighthouse the Allies used for the weather forecast on D-Day 1944, and the landing was delayed by a day because of an inclement forecast. Blackrock Lighthouse lies 12 miles (19 km) offshore on Blackrock Island. Eagle Island lighthouse lies off the northwest tip of the Mullet Peninsula.

== Transport ==
Bus Éireann route 446 links the area with Belmullet, Bangor Erris, Bellacorick, Crossmolina and Ballina. There are four outbond and three inbound services on weekdays. Onward bus and rail connections are available at Ballina.

== Tourism ==
Throughout the summer, boat trips to the Inishkea Islands, Inishglora, where the Children of Lir are reputed to be buried, and Duvillaun off the North Mayo coastline leave from Blacksod.

Elly Bay is a popular location for many watersports and the location of Colaiste Uisce Adventure Centre, which teaches watersports and other sports through the medium of the Irish language to schoolchildren and adventure groups from across Ireland.

== See also ==
- Wild Atlantic Way

== Gallery ==
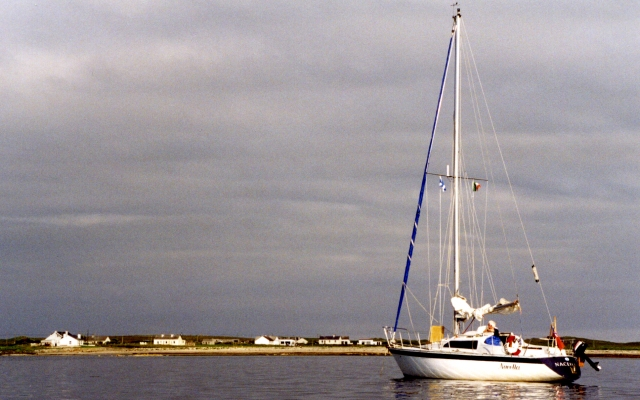
A sail boat at Elly Bay, Erris, County Mayo

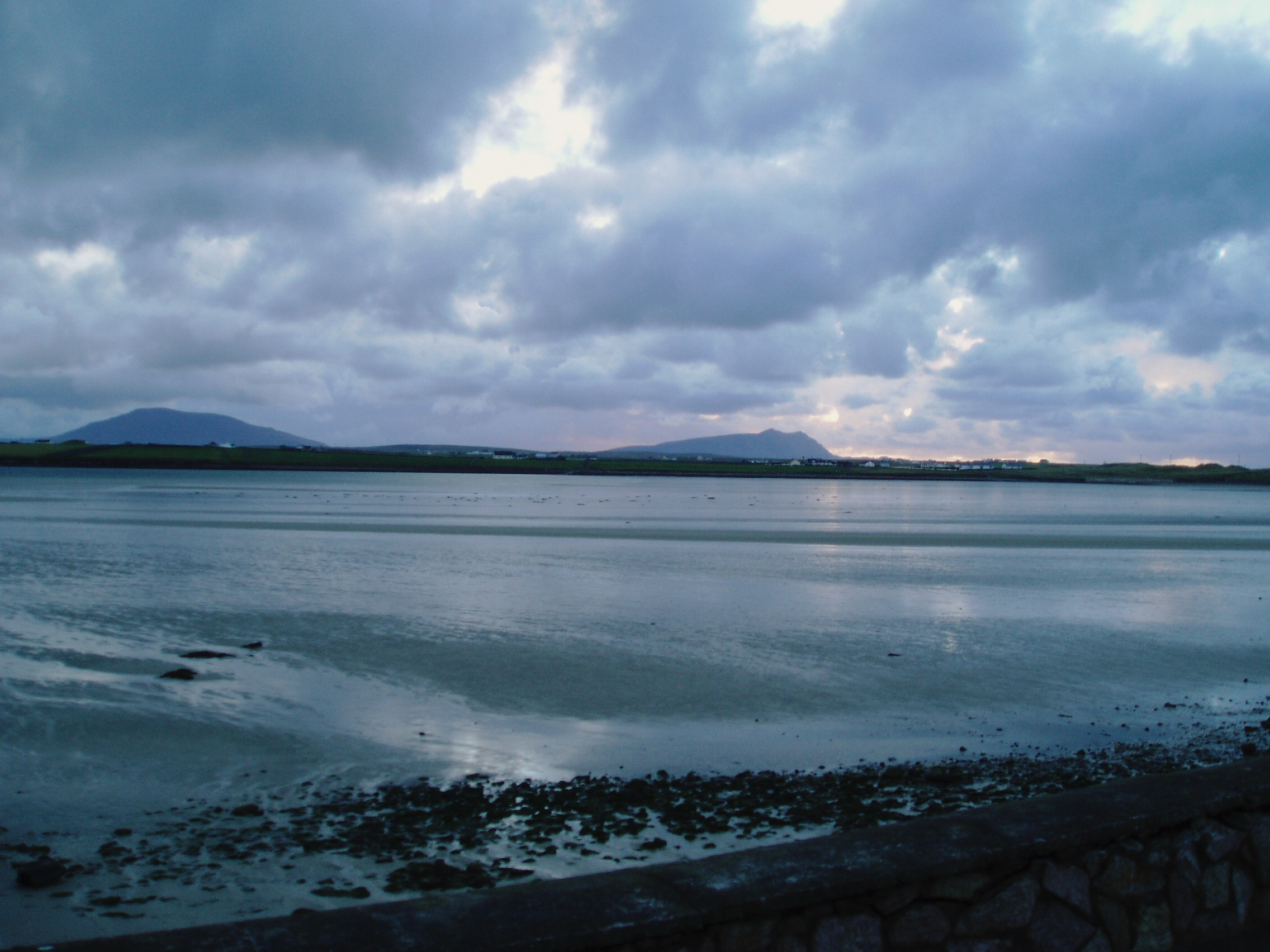
Blacksod Bay with Achill Island to the south

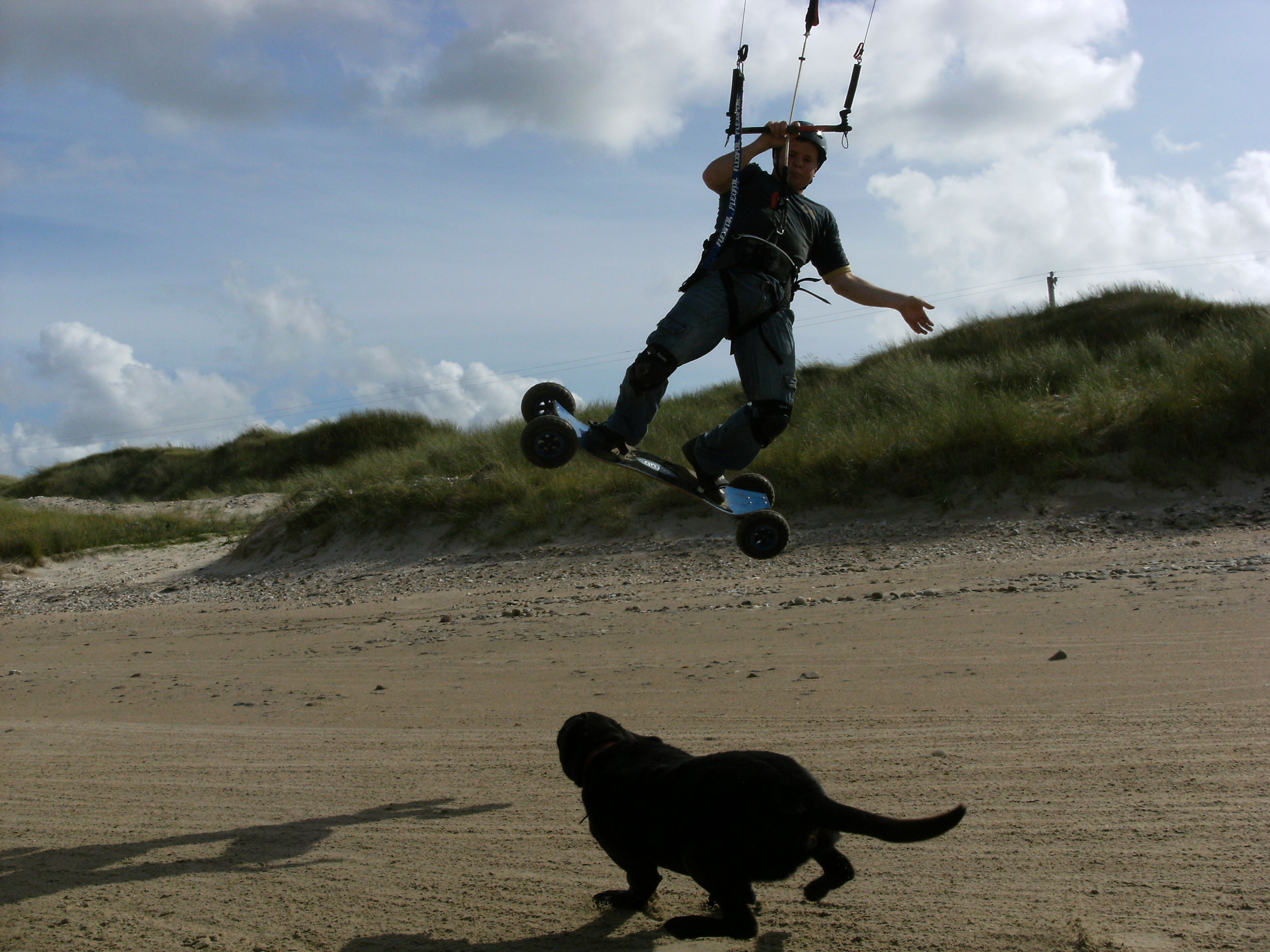
Kite boarding at Claggan beach, part of Blacksod Bay
