= Bangor Erris =

Town in County Mayo, Ireland

Bangor Erris Baingear
- Town
- Location in Ireland
- Coordinates: 54°08′35″N 9°44′25″W
- Country: Ireland
- Province: Connacht
- County: County Mayo
- Elevation: 96 m (315 ft)

Population (2016)
  - Total: 306
- Time zone: UTC+0 (WET)
  - Summer (DST): UTC-1 (IST (WEST))
- Irish Grid Reference: F863229

Bangor Erris (Irish: Baingear) is a town in Kiltane parish in Erris, County Mayo, Ireland with a population of over 300. It is on the banks of the Owenmore River and is a "gateway" to the Erris Peninsula linking Belmullet with Ballina and Westport. It is located at the foot of the "Bangor Trail", a 22-mile mountain pass across the Nephin Beg Mountain Range to Newport. Approximately 2 km away is Carrowmore Lake. Bangor is a centre for wild Atlantic salmon and sea trout fishing. Due west from Bangor are the towns of Belmullet, Geesala, Mulranny, Westport and Doolough.

== History ==
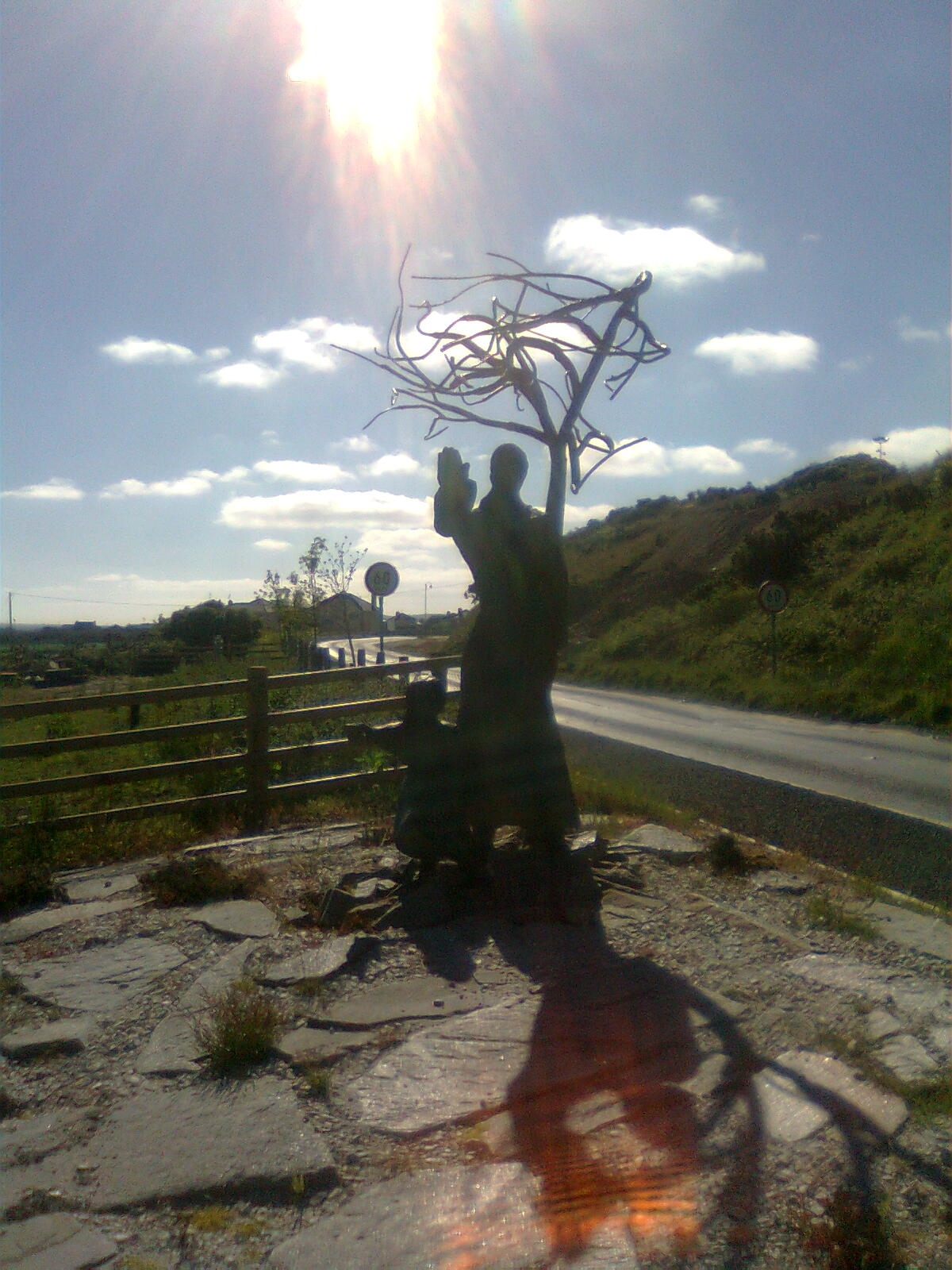
Sculpture at eastern outskirts of Bangor Village

The original name for Bangor was Doire Choinadaigh (Kennedy's Wood), a name found on maps from 1724 to 1829. The place was also called 'Coineadach' by John O'Donovan in the Ordnance Survey Name Books of 1838. In 1802 when James McPartlan (Statistical Survey p. 159) surveyed the area, he called the village 'Cahal' and noted that there were regular fairs held there at that time. Locally the village was known as 'Aonach Cathail' because a wealthy buyer of that name was a regular at the fair days. The name 'Bangor' was given to the village by Major Denis Bingham who established the town of Bangor Erris.

The reason Bangor was chosen as a site for Bingham's town was because it was situated at the crossroads of two old roads which were in use from about the middle of the 18th century. One road led from Carne (Mullet peninsula) to Castlebar and the other went from Inver (Kilcommon) to Newport. Both roads were repaired by order of the County Assizes in 1793. The crossroads was well sheltered from the worst of the prevailing winds and its situation on the banks of the Owenmore River also made it a suitable site.

Major Bingham introduced the Revenue Police to stamp out the illicit distillation of drink, in reality it was to get personal protection for himself in his house Bingham Lodge on the western edge of the town. A post office was established in the town in 1842.

The local parish church dates back to the mid-19th Century.

The sculpture pictured at the top of this page is "the Crying Stone" by Colm Brennan. It was commissioned as part of the Millennium Initiative of Mayo County Council and stands beside the N59 just east of the village of Bangor Erris. It commemorates the sorrow felt by so many inhabitants of the area when their kinsfolk set off to seek a better life in America.

The Townagh flood

In December 1818, four lakes just outside Bangor Erris burst their banks after heavy rains, unleashing a torrent of water that killed 17 people. The majority of the victims were from the O'Hara family. Three soldiers from the 92nd Highlanders were also killed. The soldiers were on revenue duty and were lodging with the O'Hara family. All three soldiers were veterans of the Battle of Waterloo. During the same storm, two other soldiers were killed when they got lost in the bog.

=== 20th Century ===
Irish War of Independence

In January 1921, a local man, Michael McAndrew (aged 27), was stabbed in the neck by a soldier. McAndrew was attempting to take the soldier's rifle when he received the wound. He was taken to Belmullet Hospital where he survived the injury.

==== Largan Landslide(1928) ====
In September 1928 an enormous landslide took place in Largan, just outside Bangor Erris. The landslide originated from the hillside and descended towards the trunk road connecting Ballina and Belmullet. The destructive force of the landslide caused substantial damage to the area. A bridge along the trunk road was demolished, leading to the suspension of traffic for approximately 12 hours. The disruption delayed mail delivery to Belmullet on Monday. Passengers traveling by bus from Ballina to various stations in Erris were stranded at the scene of the incident overnight.

==== Upper Glencullen Landslide (1931) ====
In February 1931, a landslide occurred at Upper Glencullen, four miles from Bangor Erris. It claimed the residence of the Moran family, as well as the lives of seven cattle, while £29 was buried beneath the debris. The family narrowly escaped as their home crumbled. One Moran girl, who was ill, was carried by her brother for two miles across the mountain. A hillside of mountain bog disintegrated, rushing down at speeds of about 20 inches per hour and a height of approximately 30 feet. It covered land with peat and boulders up to six feet high. Piles of potatoes were destroyed. The landslide threatened three other houses, forcing residents to flee with belongings. The affected families sought refuge with neighbors. The Land Commission received a report and planned to assist the affected families. Efforts were underway to support the victims of this unfortunate event.

==== Mayo Arms Dump Discovery (1934) ====
During road construction near Bangor Erris in February 1934. Workmen discovered a hidden cache of weapons buried ten feet below the surface. The discovery consisted of a large box measuring 12 feet in length and three feet in width, securely bound by six sturdy copper hoops. Inside the box, an assortment of weapons was revealed. Notably, 36 pikes with handles were found in remarkably preserved condition, indicating their origin from the 1798 period. Additionally, several pike heads without handles were discovered, hinting at the possible existence of a larger arsenal. Furthermore, the cache contained seven rifles that had suffered significant rust damage. Interestingly, these rifles resembled the type used by the French when they landed at Killala in 1798.

=== 21st Century ===
Bangor Erris won the 2009 national Gum Litter Award in the Tidy Towns category, making it the first winner from the west of Ireland. The competition, sponsored by the Gum Litter Taskforce, recognized the efforts of the town in keeping their village tidy and free of gum litter.

In June 2014, the Gardaí from Belmullet searched a house near Bangor Erris, finding 30 cannabis plants at various growth stages, along with a drying chamber, fertiliser, and liquid feed. The Gardaí seized cannabis plants worth €40,000 and arrested a 20-year-old man from Bangor Erris for possession. The man was suspected of operating a grow house for several months.

== Transport ==
Bus Éireann route 446 links Bangor Erris with Bellacorick, Crossmolina and Ballina. In the reverse direction it links to Belmullet and the Mullet Peninsula. There are now four services a day in each direction, including Sundays. On Friday evenings an extra journey operates from Ballina. Onward rail and bus connections are available at Ballina.

== Education ==
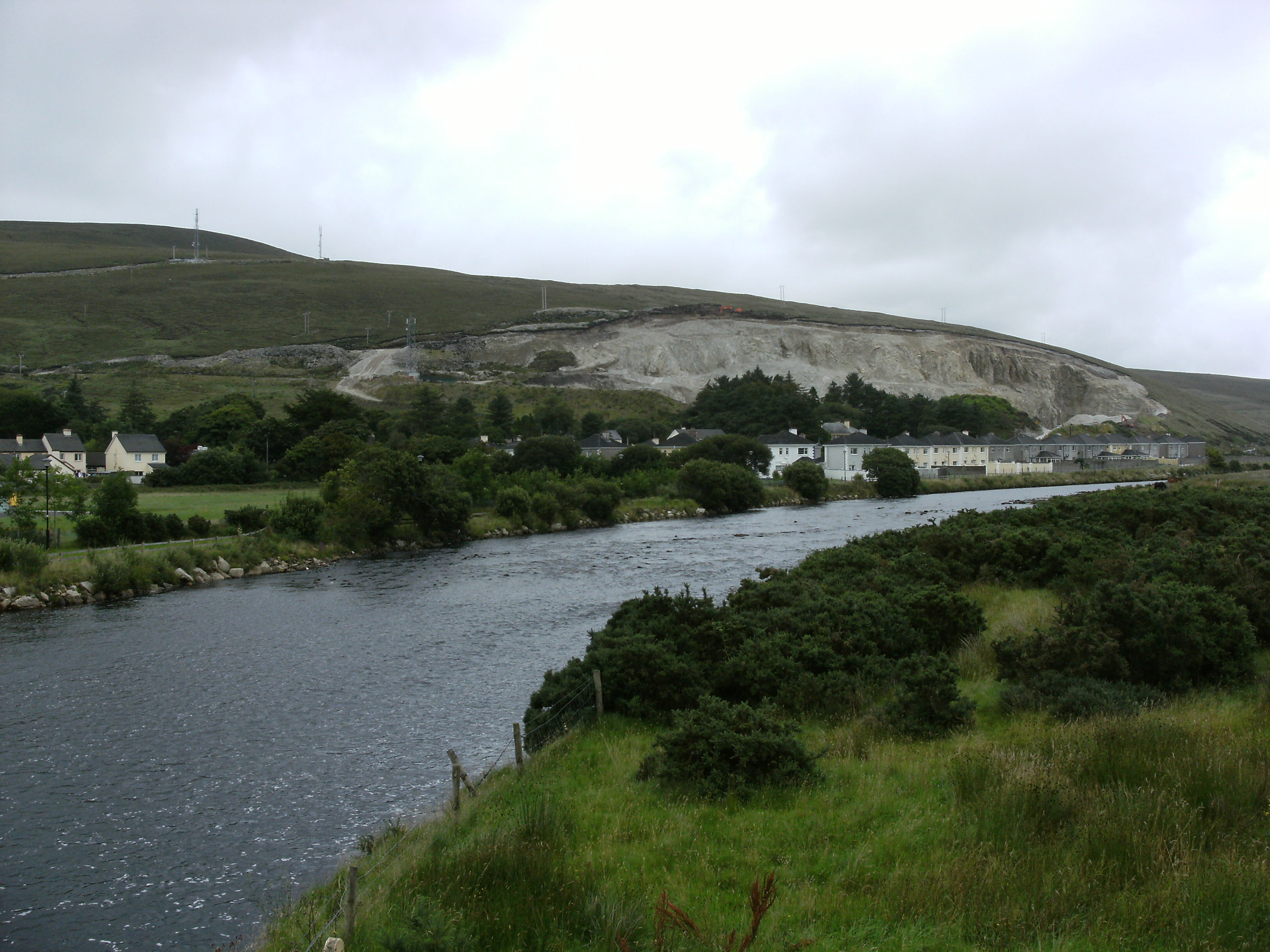
Village of Bangor Erris

Primary education in Bangor is facilitated by Bangor National School, which serves not only the village but also neighboring areas like Tawnagh and Bellacorick. As of 2023, the school had 40 pupils.

== Religion ==
Sacred Heart Catholic Church holds significant historical and religious importance in the community. The establishment of Sacred Heart Church marked the replacement of an older church, which had been erected in 1856. The current building was constructed in 1947. The church underwent renovations in 1971, ensuring its continued relevance and structural integrity. As part of the Kiltane Parish within the Diocese of Killala, it plays a vital role in providing spiritual guidance and support to the local Catholic community. Its proximity to the national school further reinforces its position as a central religious hub within the area.

== Sport ==
=== Gaelic Football ===
Kiltane GAA Club, previously St. Patrick's, is a prominent GAA club in County Mayo, Ireland. Established in 1962, it officially became Kiltane GAA Club in 1971. They quickly progressed from a junior club to senior status, winning the County Junior Championship in 1972 and the county Intermediate Championship in 1973. In 1992, they achieved notable success at the senior level, clinching division, senior league, and Global windows league titles. The club opened its own grounds and dressing rooms in 1978, hosting a match between Mayo and Galway. Their clubhouse provides various facilities and accommodates basketball, badminton, volleyball, and indoor football. In 1994, a stand was inaugurated in honor of John McAndrew and James Cosgrove, with a senior football challenge match held between Mayo and Westmeath.

=== Soccer ===
Bangor Hibs Football Club was founded in 1995. Soccer had always been popular in the area and some attempts were made in the mid-seventies and again in the mid-eighties to organise the game on a structured basis, but to no avail. In January 1995 a team from the village was invited to play in a tournament in Killala which led to them playing against a number of established Mayo League sides, the results of which were very favourable for Bangor. They eventually reached the final of an 8-team competition and this was the catalyst for getting a team together to play in the Mayo Association Football League. Their initial application to the Mayo League that year was unsuccessful, but they were admitted the following year, in 1996, which was the first time Mayo played summer soccer. The official opening of Bangor Hibs' Ballybeg Park, by the President of the FAI Mr Pat Quigley, took place on 26 August 2000.

== Notable people ==
- Johnny Carey, footballer.
- John McAndrew – A member of the 1950 and 1951 Mayo teams that won the All-Ireland.
- Eileen Lynn Kato – A renowned academic and translator of Japanese poetry and theater. In 1991, she was appointed as Gakari (advisor) to the Japanese emperor.

== Places of interest ==
- The Bangor Trail - A challenging and isolated hiking trail spanning approximately 40 km. It stretches from Bangor to Newport, but a shorter option of 26 km is available by leaving a car at Letterkeen or arranging transportation. Marked with trail markers, the path cuts through the remote Nephin Beg mountain range and Owenduff Bog. Believed to be an ancient drover path dating back to the Iron Age, it served as the primary route between Bangor and Newport since the 16th century. The trail reveals traces of past human settlements, particularly from the mid-19th century when the area experienced high population density before the Great Famine. Completing the Bangor Trail usually takes a minimum of 10 hours, although 12 hours or more are common. It requires experienced and well-equipped hikers.
- Church of the Sacred Heart - Built in 1946 and opened in 1947, the church features a rectangular plan with a pitched slate roof, concrete coping, and a bellcote. The church is part of the mid-twentieth-century ecclesiastical heritage and has architectural and historical significance. It has been well maintained and retains its original features, showcasing the artistic and engineering qualities of the design.
- Bingham Lodge - Originally built in 1823, the lodge underwent various alterations and repairs over the years. The interior features a central hall and carved timber surrounds to door and window openings. The lodge is situated in grounds overlooking the Owenmore River and was associated with the Bingham family. Despite neglect and an arson attack in 1922, the lodge retains its form and much of its original fabric.

== Folklore ==
The area around Bangor Erris is rich in local folklore. The legend of the Ulster Cycle took place not far from Bangor Erris at the fort at Rathmorgan beside Carrowmore Lake. Known as Táin Bó Flidhais it tells the story of a cattle raid around the 1st century AD.

There is a folktale that the road between Bangor Erris and Ballycroy is haunted by magical creatures. A phantom dog sometimes appears, as does a white cow, whose appearance is regarded as a warning of death. Several of the local lakes are associated with folk tales of 'water horses", which sometimes come onto the land and try to get people to mount them, and subsequently take them off into the water.

== See also ==
- List of towns and villages in Ireland
