= Mullet Peninsula =

Peninsula in County Mayo, Ireland

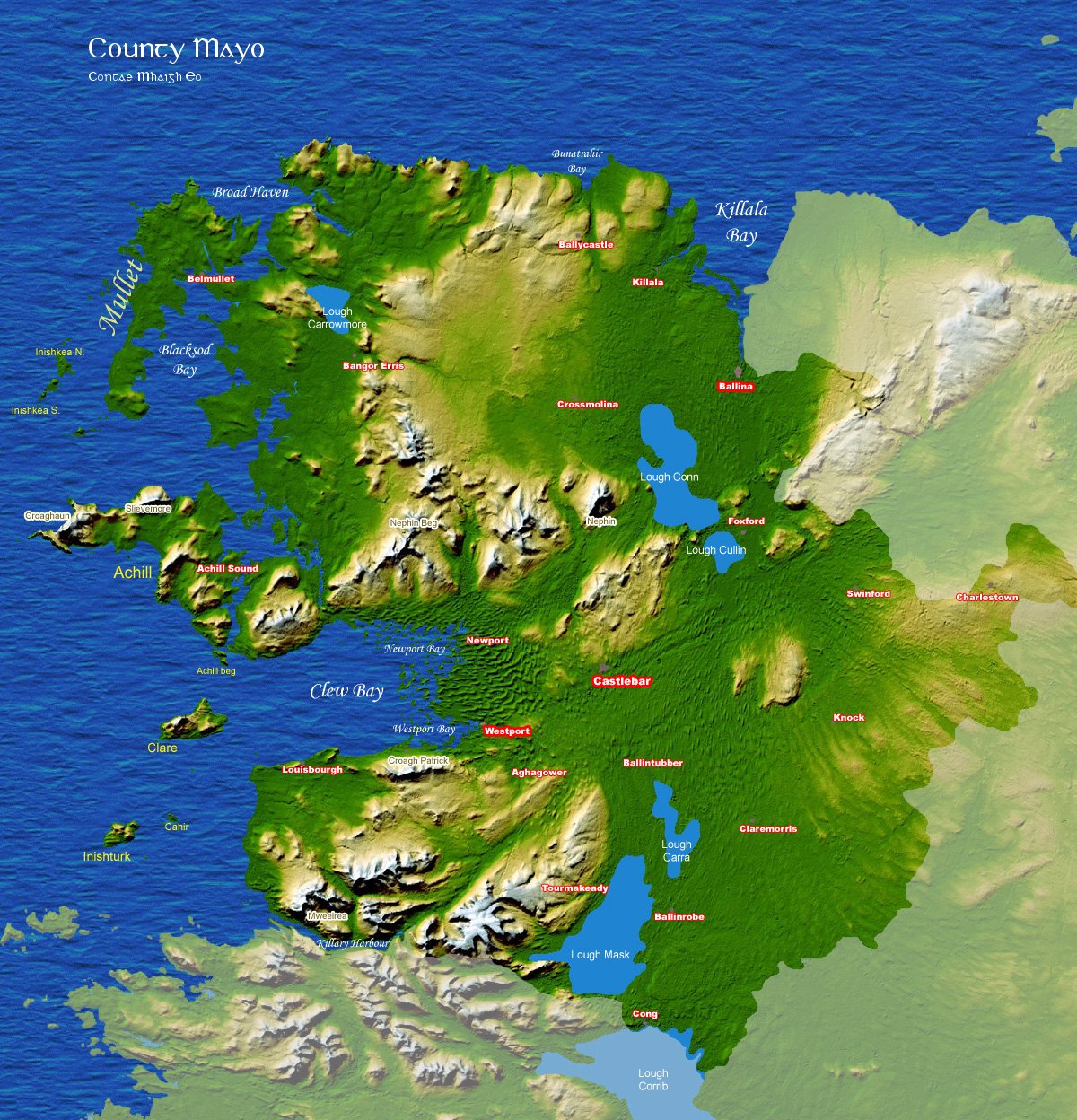
A map of County Mayo, with the Mullet Peninsula marked in the top left

The Mullet Peninsula (Irish: Leithinis an Mhuirthead)—also known as the Mullet (an Mhuirthead) and sometimes as the Erris Peninsula—is a peninsula in the barony of Erris in County Mayo, Ireland. As of 2016 it has a population of 3963. It consists of a large promontory connected to the mainland at Belmullet (Béal an Mhuirthead), a town of about 1,000 inhabitants, by a narrow isthmus. There are several villages on the Mullet peninsula including Aughleam, Elly, Corclough and Binghamstown. The Peninsula is about 33 km (21 mi) long and ranges from 200 metres (660 ft) to 12 km (7.5 mi) wide. Its northernmost point is Erris Head. The peninsula's doglegged shape forms two bays, Blacksod Bay and Broadhaven Bay.

The Mullet Peninsula is part of the Mayo Gaeltacht, meaning that Irish is a relatively common language. According to the 2016 census about 8% of the population spoke Irish on a daily basis outside the education system. The area has several Irish-language summer schools. The Mullet is a tourist destination, and has several beaches and a mild climate; chief attractions include golf, watersports, kiting, boating, fishing, and sea-angling.

== Name ==
The origin of the names Mullet and an Mhuirthead is not clear. They may have come from Irish Muileat or an Mhuileat, which has been translated as "(the) isthmus". Bernard O'Hara in Mayo: Aspects of its Heritage suggests that "A change from 'L' to 'R', which is quite common in Irish" may have resulted in a change to an Mhuireat, which in turn became an Mhuirthead. It has also been suggested that the name may be from English and refer to the fish or the star shape used in heraldry.

== Antiquities and places of interest ==
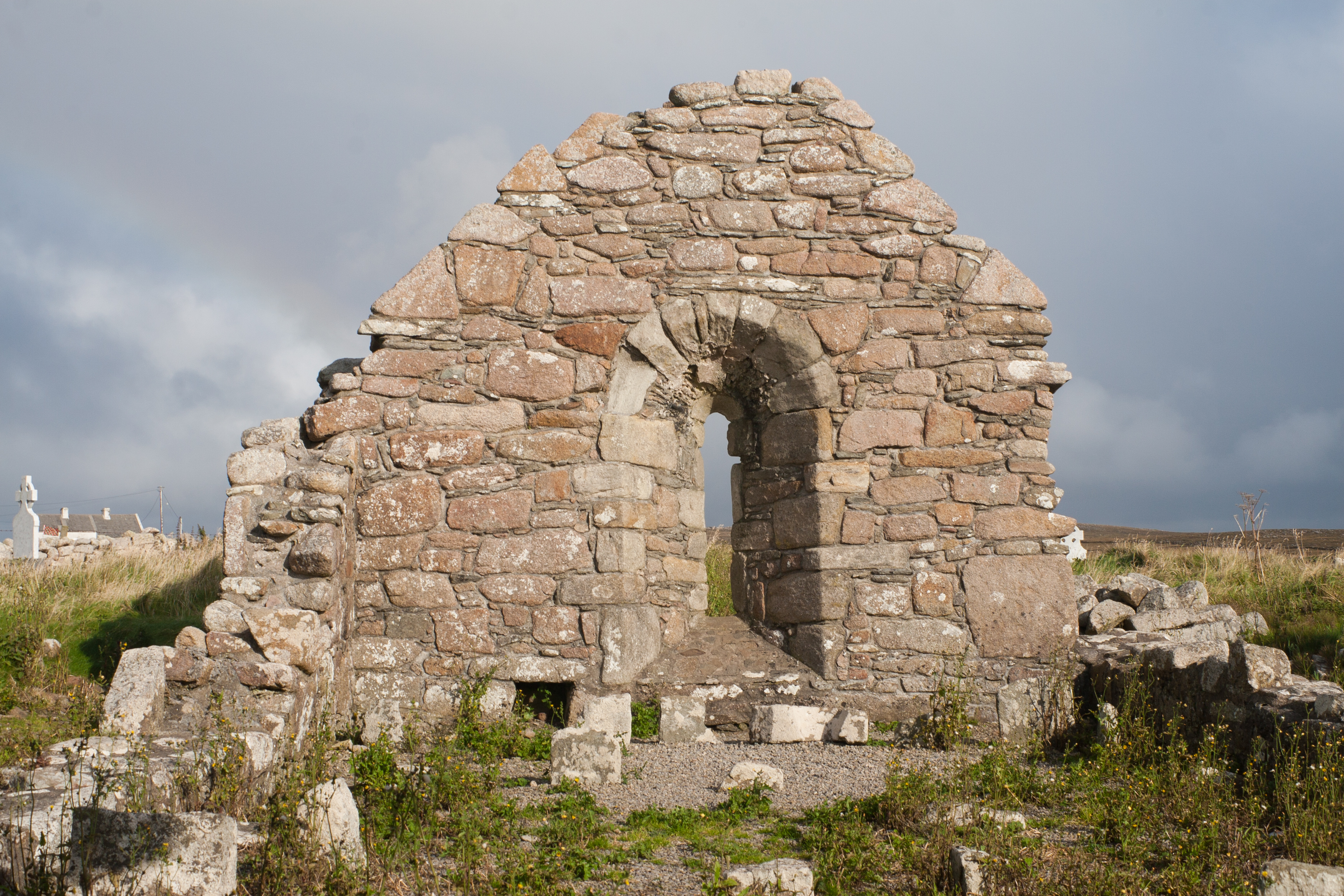
St. Dairbhile's Church, a medieval place of worship

Several islands lie off the coast of the Mullet peninsula including the Inishkea Islands, Inishglora and Duvillaun. St. Brendan the Navigator established a monastery at Inishglora at the start of his sea voyage. There are lighthouses on other small islands off the coast at Blackrock and Eagle Island.

The Saint Deirbhle heritage centre based at Aughleam near the southern end of the peninsula has a collection of books and historical information on the area. St. Dairbhile's Church and St. Deirbhile's Well, where it is alleged that a cure for eye problems can be acquired, is a couple of miles from the centre.

Glosh tower on Termon Hill is one of the 82 Napoleonic signal towers built 1801-1806 by the English holds a commanding view of the area.

Sculptures may be found on Glosh Beach.

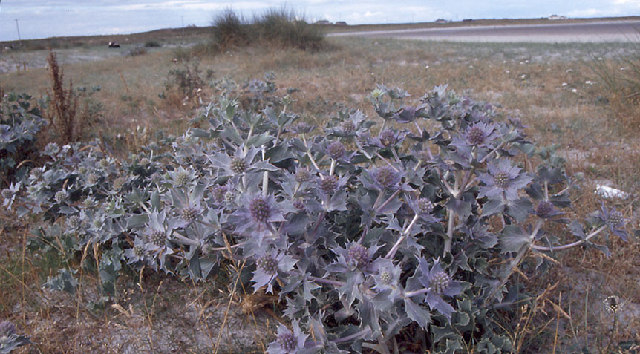
Sea holly at Termoncarragh

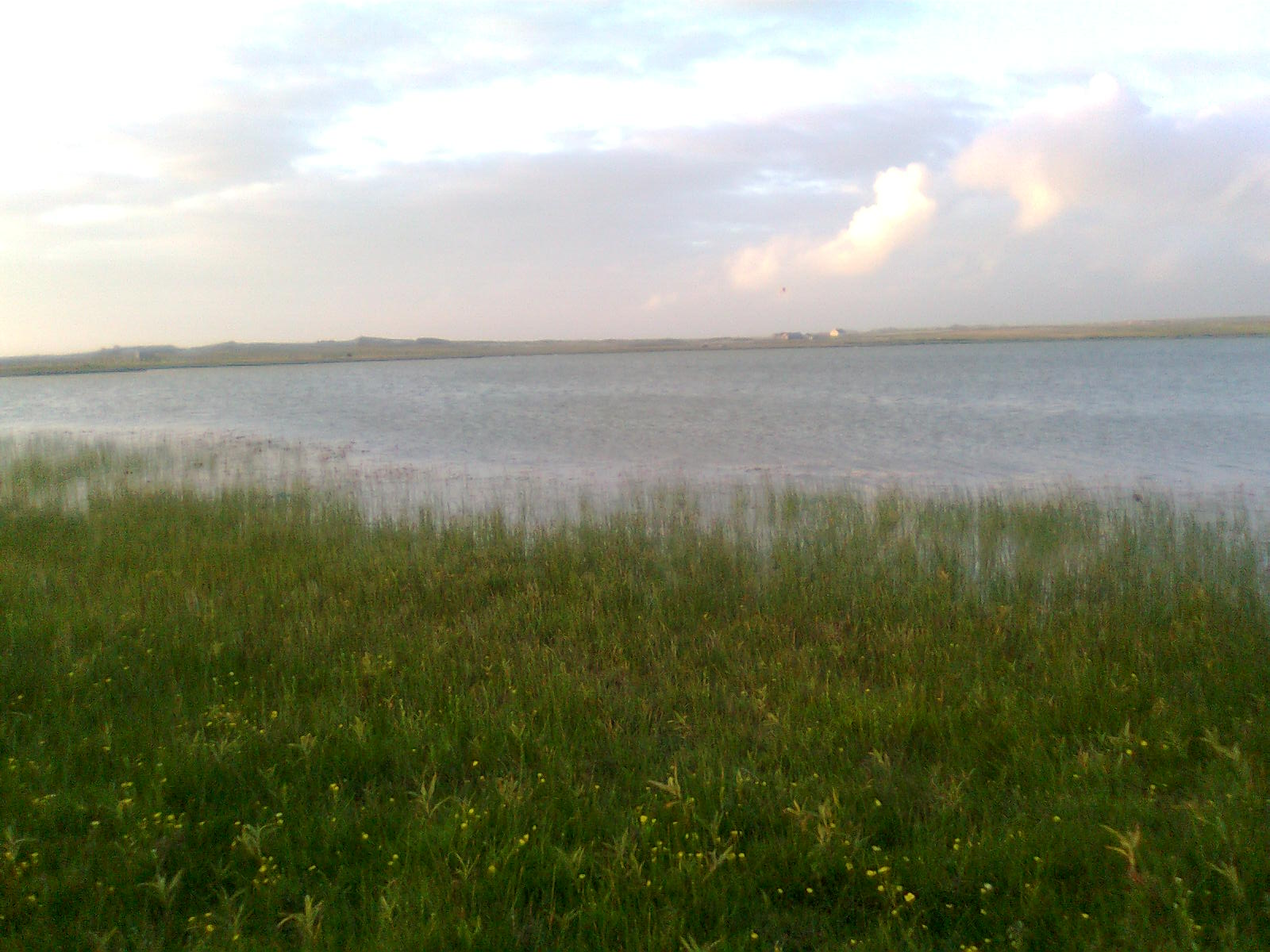
Cross Lake, Mullet Peninsula, July 2010

== Transport ==
Bus Éireann route 446 links the peninsula with Belmullet, Bangor Erris, Bellacorick, Crossmolina and Ballina. There is one service a day in each direction, including Sundays. On Friday evenings an extra journey operates from Ballina. Onward bus and rail connections are available at Ballina.

== See also ==
- Blacksod Bay Railway Terminus
- Wild Atlantic Way
