= Townlands of Kilcommon =

Townlands in County Mayo, Ireland

Coordinates: 53°54′N 9°15′W

The civil parish of Kilcommon in Erris, northern County Mayo, Ireland has a total of 37 townlands: small geographic divisions of land in Ireland and Scotland's Outer Hebrides. Townlands originated in Gaelic Ireland, and predate the late-12th-century Anglo-Norman invasion. However, some townland names (and boundaries) are derived from British plantations and Norman manors.

== Aughoose ==
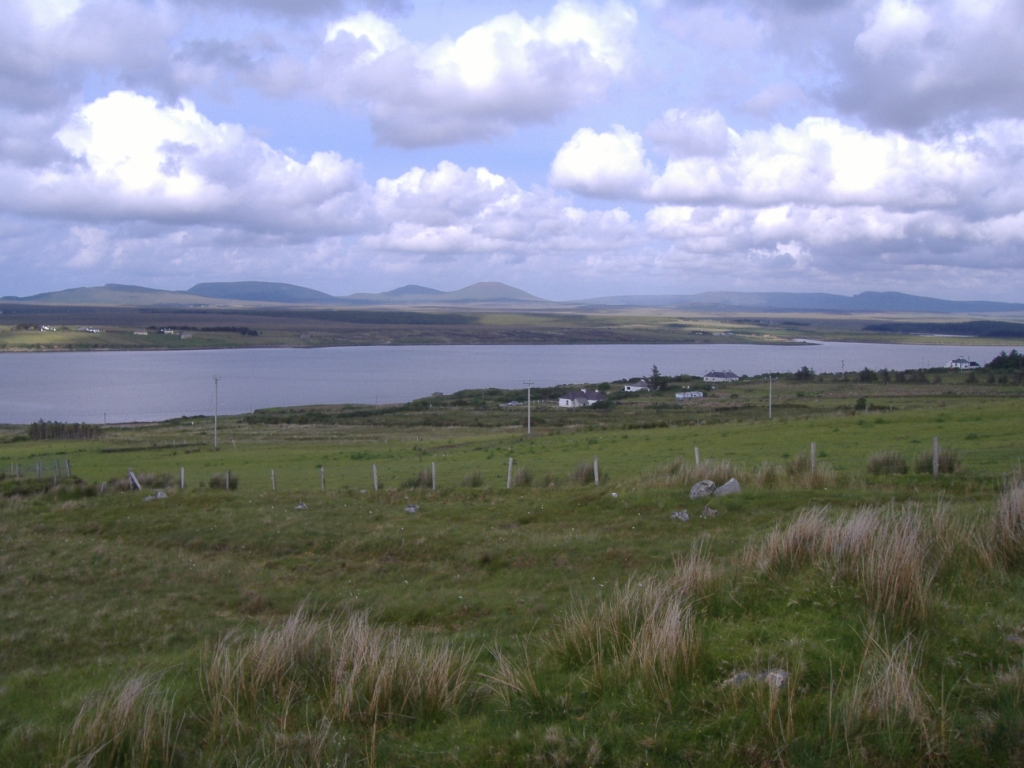
Sruwaddacon Bay, seen from Aughoose

Aughoose (Irish: Na hEachú) is on the Dún Chiortáin peninsula overlooking the lower reaches of Sruwaddacon Bay (Sruth Fada Conn), and has an area of 898 acres (3.63 km^{2}). There was a small chapel along the stream at Lenamore during the 18th century, a rare sight due to the contemporary Penal Laws. Until the 1950s, Aughoose had a dance hall. A lace school was organised by the Congested Districts Board; The schools were at their peak during the World Wars (when they made uniform buttons and other goods for armies serving abroad), later turning to knitted and crocheted goods. The local headquarters of the Lady Dudley Nursing Scheme was in Aughoose during the early 20th century, and the nurses cared for patients throughout the parish. In the early 1970s, the nursing scheme was absorbed into the Health Services. Aughoose is near Bellanaboy and its proposed above-ground Corrib Gas pipeline. Although the people of Aughoose are opposed to the project, a large portion of Lenamore has been sold to Shell.

== Barnatra ==
Barnatra (Irish: Barr na Trá) straddles the parishes of Kilcommon and Kilmore at the lower end of Broadhaven Bay. On a crossroads, its roads lead west into Belmullet and the Mullet Peninsula, north through the Dun Chaocháin peninsula to Glengad and Pollathomas, east to Glenamoy and the Céide Fields and south to Carrowmore Lake, Bangor Erris and Castlebar and Ballina, about 80 kilometres (50 mi) away.

== Bellanaboy ==
Bellanaboy (Irish: Béal an Átha Buí) covers an area of 1,050 acres (4.2 km^{2}), most of which is now enclosed around a fossil-fuel refinery under heavy security which has been built by Royal Dutch Shell on government, Coillte-controlled conifer plantation land. The townland is at the south-eastern point of the Sruwaddacon Bay estuary. The Aughoose River, also known as the Yellow River, flows through Bellanaboy on its way to Carrowmore Lake, which supplies Erris' drinking water. Along the riverbed is the soft yellow subsoil which gives the townland its name. Bellanaboy has been flooded a number of times, with fatalities.

== Carrowteige ==
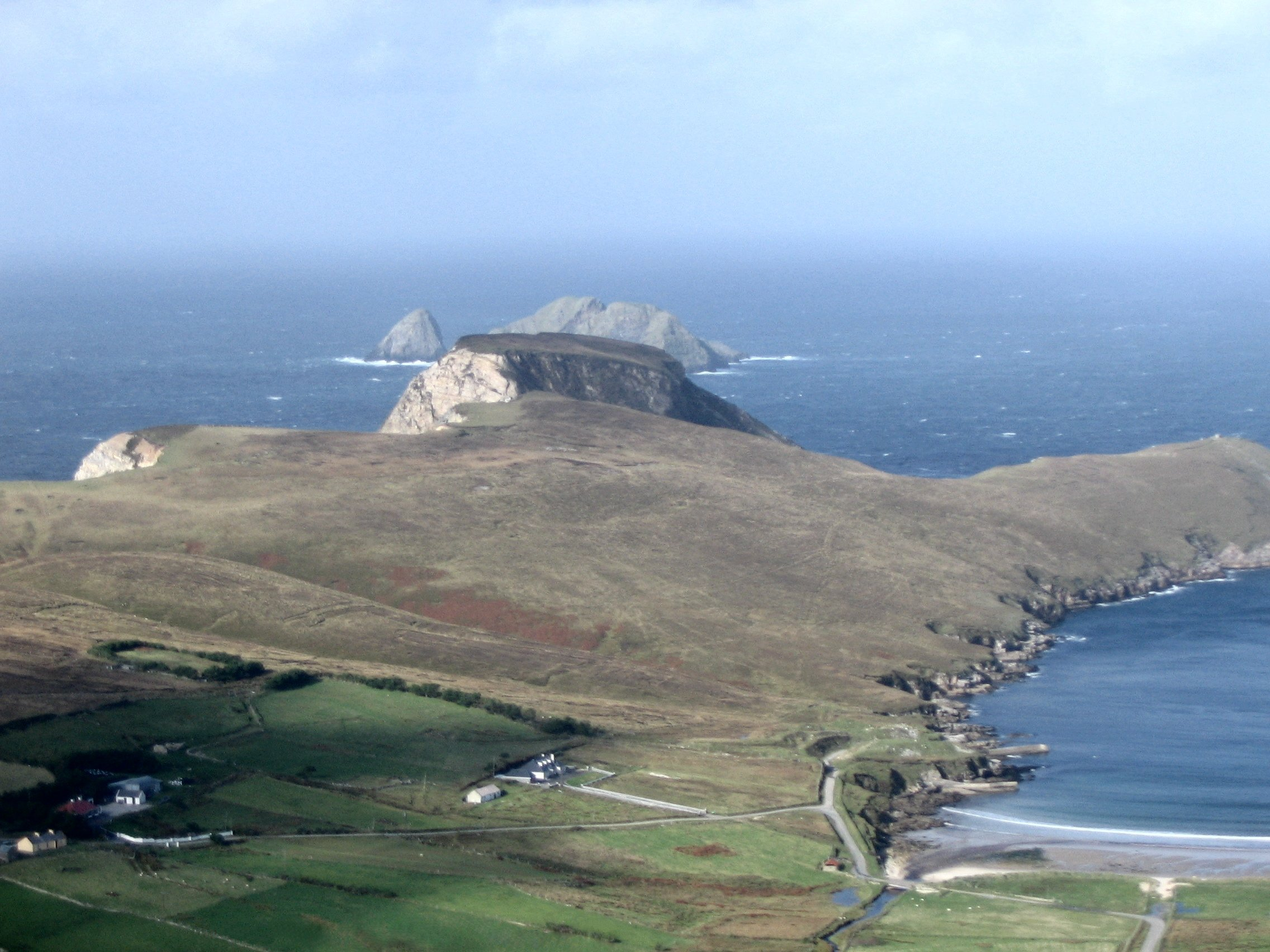
Cill Ghallagáin (Kilgalligan), with Portacloy Beach on the bottom left

Carrowteige (Irish: Ceathrú Thaidhg) is a 403-acre (1.63 km^{2}) Gaeltacht village near the end of the Dún Chaocháin peninsula. It has a Catholic church, a national school, and a shop. Comhar Dún Chaocháin Teo is based in the village, and marked cliff walks begin there.

== Cill Ghallagháin ==
Cill Ghallagáin (English: Kilgalligan) is on the northern tip of the Dun Chiortáin peninsula, and a small village bears its name. Wild and rugged, it overlooks Broadhaven Bay and the Atlantic Ocean. Cill Ghallagáin is noted for its microtoponymy and its seventh-century graveyard on the north side of Sruwaddacon Bay.

== Cornboy ==
Cornboy, also known as Curraunboy, is a coastal townland on the Dún Chaocháin peninsula, covering 2,755 acres (11.15 km^{2}). The village centre is inland, near Garter Hill. It had surrounded the old chapel on the hill overlooking Broadhaven Bay, but blowing sand moved residents inland from Cornboy Pier and its sand dunes.

An area known as Sandhills Settlement contains evidence of Iron Age human settlement, possibly cairns and middens, with large sand dunes and sandy beaches. The Gweedaney River rises at Portacloy and flows past the old chapel in the dunes into Sruwaddacon Bay; the modern church is farther inland. Cornboy shares Knockadaff mountain with Garter Hill. Knockadaff was an electoral district of the Belmullet poor law union and an administrative division of Erris. A 9-kilometre (5.6 mi) walking loop climbs Garter Hill through fields and the seashore.

== Cornhill ==
Cornhill (Irish: Gort an Chairn) is a village on Dooncarton Hill, overlooking Sruwaddacon Bay. It has a number of fields for grazing, and the Dooncarton Hill radar tower (widely considered an eyesore) is in front of the village. Many have said that the radar tower is an eyesore and should be taken down but it is still standing. The linear village has about a dozen houses.

== Faulagh ==
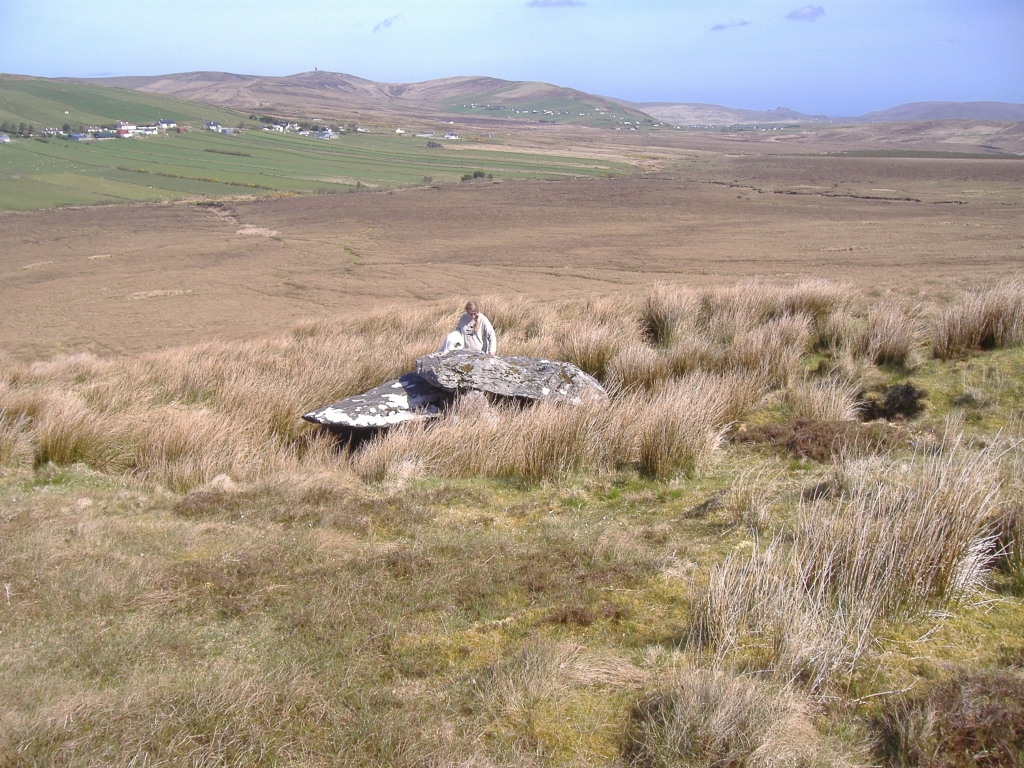
Unclassified megalithic tomb, known locally as the Grey Stone, on the northern slope of Faulagh mountain

Faulagh (Irish: Fálach) is a village on the southern slope of the mountain of the same name which overlooks Carrowmore Lake. The 946-acre (3.83 km^{2}) village, on the north side of lake, is a remote, largely boggy area. Faulagh has a number of prehistoric megaliths and field systems.

== Glenamoy ==
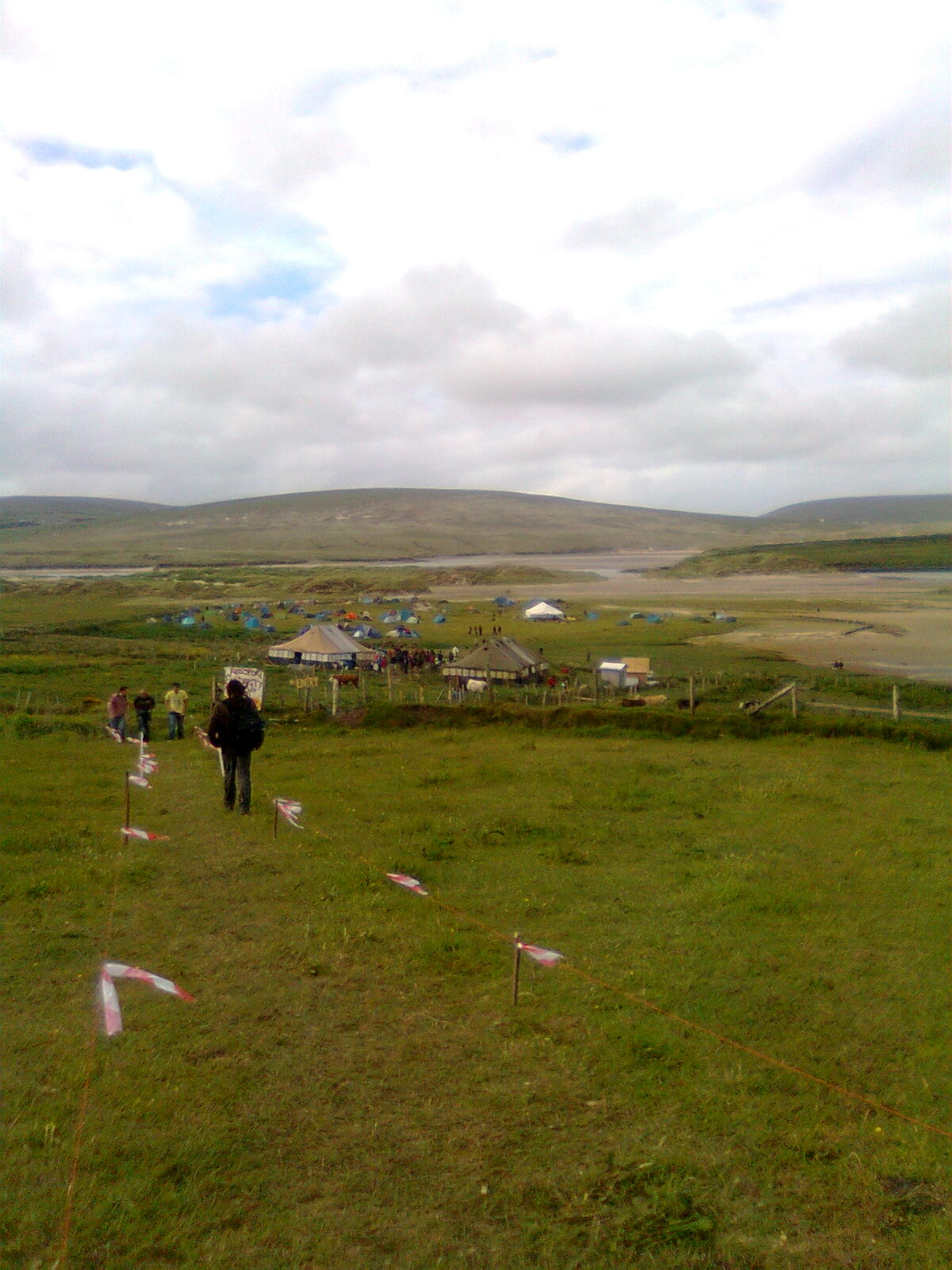
June 2010 encampment in Glengad, protesting against the Corrib gas project

Glenamoy (Irish: Gleann na Muaidhe) is the general name for nine Kilcommon townlands: Bellagelly North and South, Baralty, Bunalty, Gortleatilla, Srahnaplaia, Pollboy, Lenarevagh and Barroosky. It covers about 16,700 acres (68 km^{2}), much of it inaccessible blanket bog interspersed with conifer forests and small lakes. Glenamoy is inland from the parish's coastal townlands. The Glenamoy and Owenmore rivers rise in the nearby mountains; the Owenmore flows into Blacksod Bay, and the Glenamoy into Broadhaven Bay. Lace schools were common in the area, and 19th-century landlords hosted shooting parties for the gentry at several area hunting lodges.

== Glengad ==
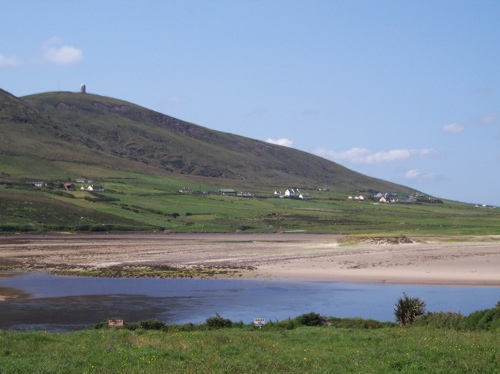
Glengad

Glengad, also known as Dooncarton (Irish: Gleann an Ghad), is a large townland on the northwestern shore of Sruwaddacon Bay. Its name is derived from willows (gads) from the Cromwellian period when the native Irish were sent "to hell or to Connaught". The settlers who came to Glengad brought the craft of basket weaving, planting willows in wet ground; willows have grown in the townland's streams ever since. It is a linear village, with houses and farms along the main road. The land was divided by the Irish Land Commission during the early 20th century; each farm is a narrow strip running from the mountain to the sea, a remnant of the rundale system of land division seen in many areas of the parish. Glengad is the hub of much of the Corrib gas controversy.

== Glinsk ==
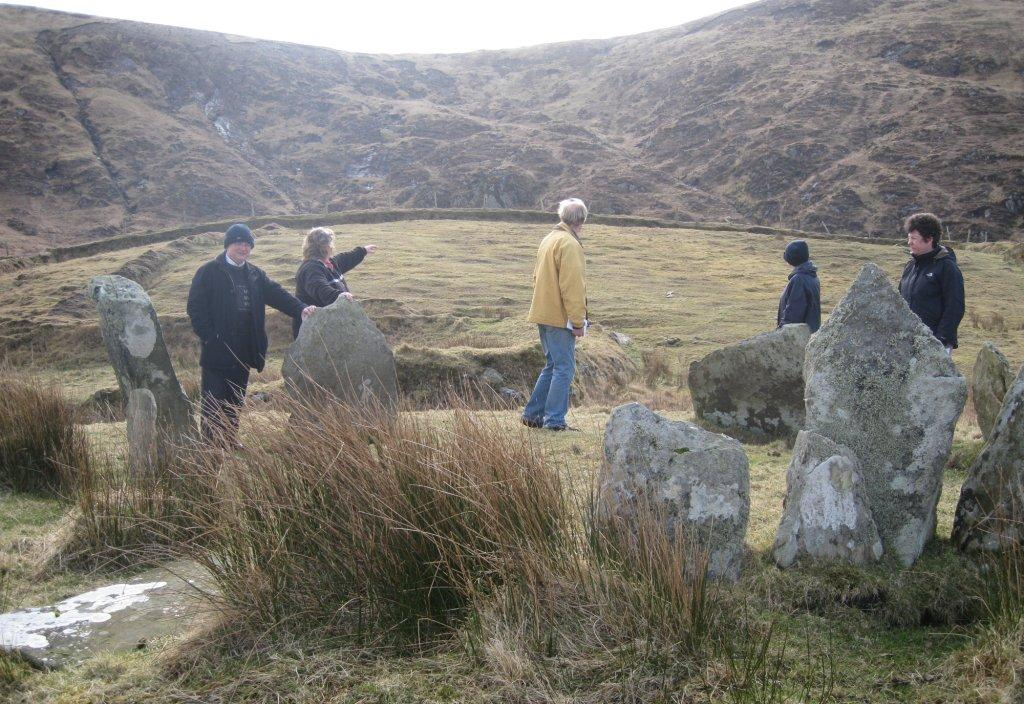
Glengad Stone Circle

Glinsk (Irish: Glinsce) is a remote townland. Glinsk Mountain is covered with blanket bog and rises steeply to overlook Broadhaven Bay and the Stags of Broadhaven from cliffs along Benwee Head. The ruins of a 1798 English watchtower are on the mountain's southern slope. Covering an area of 2,054 acres (8.31 km^{2}), the townland is presently uninhabited; the road past it was first tarred in 2004.

== Gortbrack ==
Gortbrack (Irish: An Gort Breac), occupying a large section of the south side of the western peninsula, covers an area of 1,070 acres (4.3 km^{2}) in size. The Owenduff River flows through the townland, which is of archaeological interest due to its location along the southern coastal slopes and its numerous Neolithic megaliths.

== Gortmelia ==
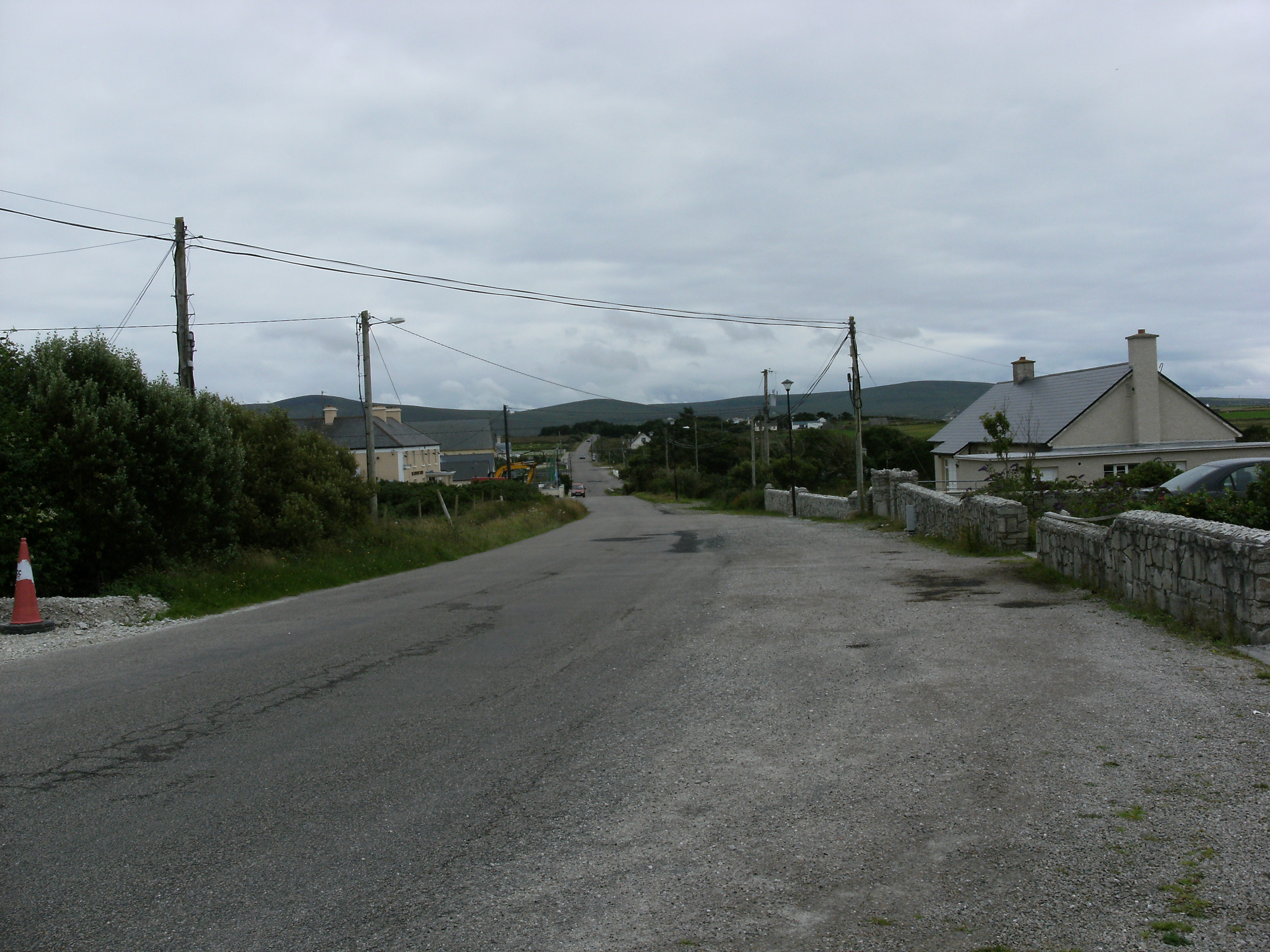
Inver

Gortmelia (Irish: Gort Meille), on the west side of the Dún Chiortáin peninsula overlooking Inver Bay, covers an area of 1,237 acres (5.01 km^{2}). In the Tithe Composition Book of 1834, Gortmelia was divided into three parts: Gortmelia Mills, Gortmellia Gallagher and Rookstown. In the later rateable valuation books, the three areas are called Gortmellia Mills, Gortmellia Gallagher and Gortmellia Houston. The townland presently has four areas: Gortmellia, Parkbaun, Ballur and Ballyhonry.

== Inver ==
Inver (Irish: An tInbhear), covering an area of 663 acres (2.68 km^{2}), is on the western side of the Dún Chiortán peninsula overlooking Trá Kirtaan (Chiortáin's Beach). The Owenduff River flows through Knocknalower and Inver to Broadhaven Bay. In 1636, Michael Cormuck lived in Inver Castle near the shore. Although Cormuck claimed much of the land in Erris, the Protestant bishop had (according to the Stafford Inquisition of Mayo, which investigated early-17th-century land ownership in the county) the "right of the sea all around Erris". The castle had crumbled by 1802, and little remains except its gateposts. Inver features in the story of the Táin Bó Flidhais; a mound is said to be the burial site of Flidhais' husband when he was stranded by Chiortain, for whom the peninsula is named.

== Pullathomas ==
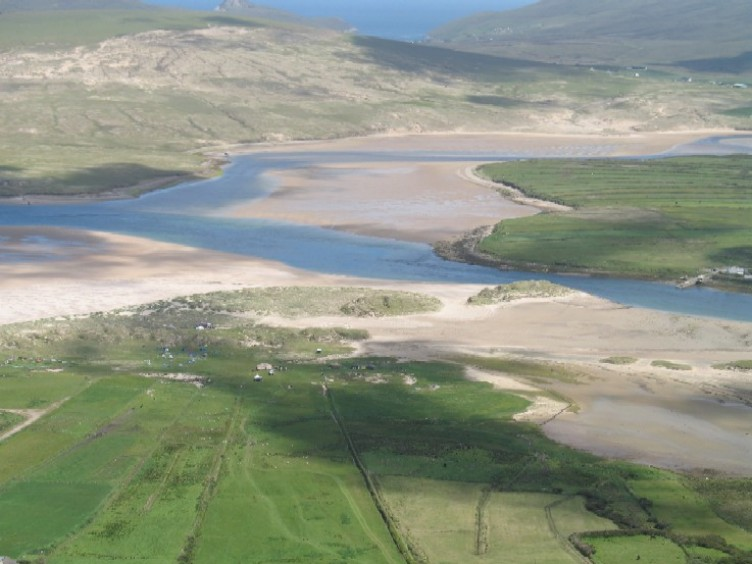
Glengad - Sruwaddacon estuary

On the Dún Chiortáin peninsula and also known as Poll a tSómais, Pollatomais, Kilcommon, Pullathomas (the most common spelling) and Pollatomish, Pollathomas covers an area of 673 acres (2.72 km^{2}). The village straddles a small crossroads and overlooks Sruwaddacon Bay. When the Anglo-Normans came to Ireland, several slayings were recorded by the native tribespeople. In 1585, during the Reformation, Pollathomas became the property of the Protestant Bishop of Killala and Michael Cormuck (who lived in Inver Castle) was the lessee. Several religious settlers, including the Augustinians, were driven out of the area during the 17th-century Penal Laws period. In 1770, Pollathomas and Glengad were leased from the Protestant Bishop by the O'Donels of Termon. Due to its increased population, Pollathomas had several famines during the early 19th century before the 1845-47 Great Famine. During that famine, residents ate seaweed and seagull eggs; landlord James O'Donel was attacked at a local lodge, and trained crows to protect his property.

== Portacloy ==
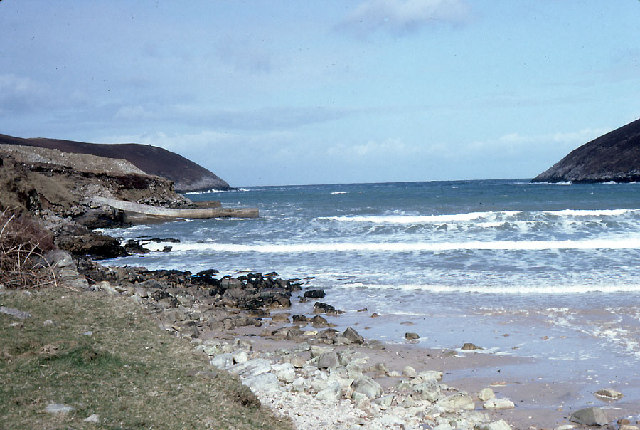
Beach at Portacloy

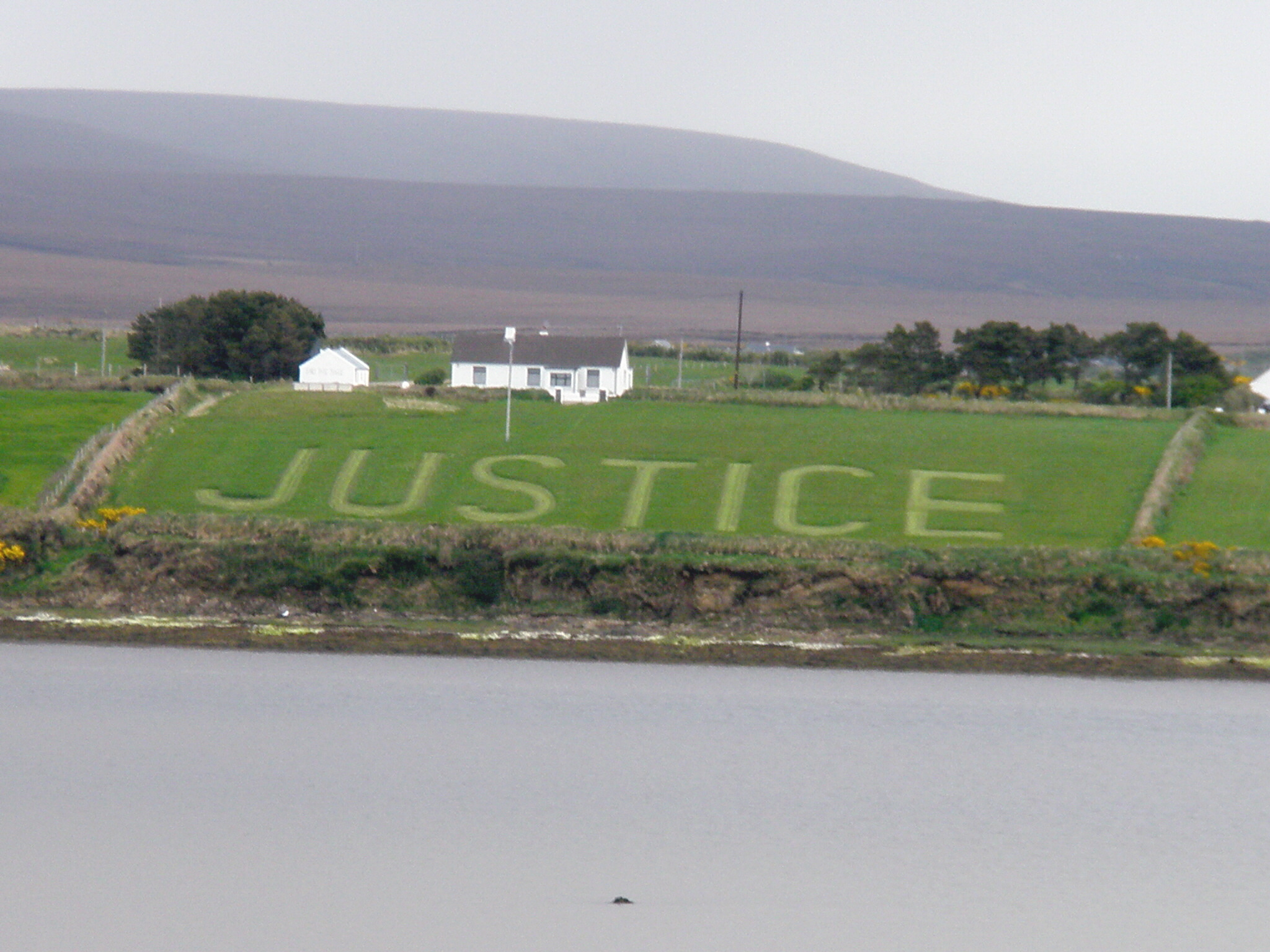
Hayfield sign in Rossport

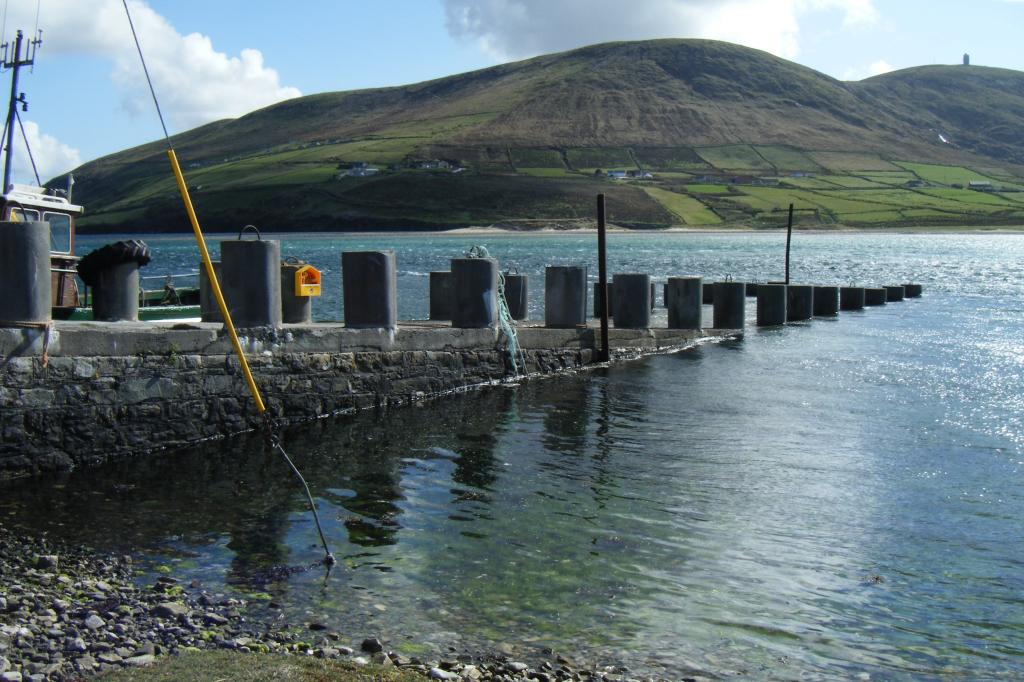
Rossport pier

Portacloy (Irish: Port an Chlóidh on the north of the Dún Chaocháin peninsula, covers an area of 922 acres (3.73 km^{2}) on the western boundary of Porturlin. The townland is on a horseshoe-shaped bay with two piers and several cliff walks. With the nearest shop in Carrowteige, it has the remnants of a promontory fort and an English watchtower here. In 1909, a pier and breakwater were built to facilitate a fish-curing station built several years earlier to process mackerel. During the 1960s, a second small pier was built.

== Porturlin ==
Porturlin (Irish: Port Durlainne), on the east coast of the Dún Chaocháin peninsula, covers an area of 2,120 acres (8.6 km^{2}). During the Great Famine, Richard Webb (who was bringing relief from the Society of Friends) called it the finest fishing grounds in Mayo but added: "The only access by land is over a high and boggy mountain, so wet and swampy that it is difficult to reach it even in summer. There is probably not in Ireland a cluster of human habitations so completely secluded from easy access ...". When William Bald improved the Erris area in 1835, he recommended building piers in Porturlin and Portacloy to aid local fishermen. During the 1840s, roads were built in the area. In 1886, the Roads and Harbour Commission built a 210-foot (64 m) landing at a cost of £204. The Congested Districts Board for Ireland erected a curing station for herring and mackerel in 1894. By 1952 the old pier had fallen into disrepair, and it was replaced in 1965 by the Mayo County Council. In June 2009, fisherman Pat O'Donnell reported that his boat was sunk by armed men allegedly connected to the Corrib gas project.

== Rossport ==
Rossport (Irish: Ros Dumhach), covering an area of 1,446 acres (5.85 km^{2}), has a national school and the Gaelic-speaking Colaiste Chomain secondary school. The construction of a bridge connecting Rossport and the Dún Chiortáin peninsula has been proposed. The tides of Sruwaddacon Bay are hazardous, as described in a song lyric:

The Rossport Ferry and its rapid current
The second strongest that our State possesses

The townland has been the scene of protests against the Corrib gas project.

== Srahataggle ==
Srahataggle (Irish: Sraith an tSeagail), covering an area of 4,167 acres (16.86 km^{2}), is a remote village; in 2004, a road connecting it to Belderrig was tarred for the first time. The Western People reported during the early 1950s, "Remote as these habitations may appear to many, there is no lack of worldly knowledge and cultural attainments and many of their sons and daughters have risen to important posts in countries beyond the seas".
