= Hands (TV series) =

Irish TV documentary series about crafts

- Genre: Documentary, biography
- Written by: Benedict Kiely; Ray McAnally
- Directed by: David Shaw-Smith
- Narrated by: Benedict Kiely
- Composers: Jolyon Jackson, Paddy Glacken, Matt Molloy
- Country of origin: Republic of Ireland
- Original languages: English, Irish
- No. of series: 1
- No. of episodes: 37

Production
- Producer: David Shaw-Smith
- Running time: 24–27 minutes

Original release
- Network: RTÉ1
- Release: 1978 – 1989

Related
- In Good Hands

Hands is an Irish television documentary series broadcast by RTÉ between 1978 and 1989, covering traditional Irish crafts.

== Production ==
Creator David Shaw-Smith began with Telefís Éireann in the 1960s, working as a cameraman with Gerrit van Gelderen and became an independent filmmaker in the early 1970s. he and his wife Sally, an illustrator, travelled Ireland in a VW van recording traditional craftsmen.

== Episodes ==
No.	Episode title & topic	Narrated by	Original release date
1	Wool Spinning	Seamus Ó Catháin	7 April 1978
2	Irish Patchwork	Seamus Ó Catháin	2 July 1981
3	Irish Lace	Mairead Reynolds	1 April 1983
4	Irish Embroidery	Linda Ballard	1 May 1989
5	Donegal Weavers	Ray McAnally	8 March 1980
6	Dublin Woolen Mill	Ray McAnally	19 June 1981
7	Donegal Carpets	Ray McAnally	24 April 1979
8	Tailor	Benedict Kiely	5 May 1979
9	English Silk	Alec Taylor	4 March 1985
10	Carriage Building	Seamus Ó Catháin	May 1978
11	Cavan Cabinetmakers	Benedict Kiely	1980
12	Cavan Cooper	Ray McAnally	5 June 1981
13	Chair Maker John Surlis	Benedict Kiely	1 March 1980
14	Dublin's Viking Longship	Éamonn Mac Thomáis	1988
15	Harp Making	Mícheál Ó Súilleabháin	1989
16	Hurlmaking	Diarmaid Ó Muirithe	1983
17	Irish Spinning Wheel Making	Ben Kiely	1991
18	Shannon One Design	Ben Kiely	1988
19	Carley's Bridge Potteries	Ray McAnally	1980
20	Belleek Potteries	Benedict Kiely	1987
21	Clay Pipe Works	Diarmuid Ó Muirithe	1983
22	A Dublin Silversmith	Éamonn Mac Thomáis	1980
23	Powers of the Metal	Diarmuid Ó Muirithe	1989
24	Stone	Éamonn Mac Thomáis	1981
25	Dublin's Workhorses	Éamonn Mac Thomáis	1983
26	Shoe Making	Ray McAnally	1979
27	A Dublin Bookbinder	Dr. Maurice Craig	1981
28	The Saddler	Brian McSharry	20 May 1983
29	Curraghs	Seamus Ó Catháin	1978
30	Rushwork	Seamus Ó Catháin	1989
31	Basketmaking	Andy O'Mahony	1978
32	Wexford Thatcher	Diarmuid Ó Muirithe	1981
33	Fermanagh Country	Benedict Kiely	1980
34	Stoneground	Andy O’Mahony	1978
35	A Dublin Candlemaker	Éamonn Mac Thomáis	1982
36	Of Bees & Bee Skeps	Diarmuid Ó Muirithe	1983
37	Lighthouse Crafts	Dick Warner	1989

== Legacy ==
Hands has been described as one of "Ireland’s favourite" television programs, and has been rebroadcast several times to the extent that it is one of the "most broadcast" RTÉ productions.

Harvey O'Brien, in his The Real Ireland: The Evolution of Ireland in Documentary Film (2004), said "The series was marked by its close-up observation of the techniques involved, and though lacking an explicit social commentary always gave the sense that these skills were gradually disappearing."

For over 20 years, the original film sat in tea chests in a barn in Creagh, County Mayo. In March 2013 archivists packed all 1,800 film cans into storage containers and brought them to the RTÉ Archives.

In 2013, it was revisited in the series In Good Hands.

From Christmas 2021 all programmes online at RTE Player to celebrate 60 Years of Television.
