= Curraunboy =

Townland in County Mayo

Curraunboy An Corrán Buí Cornboy
- Townland
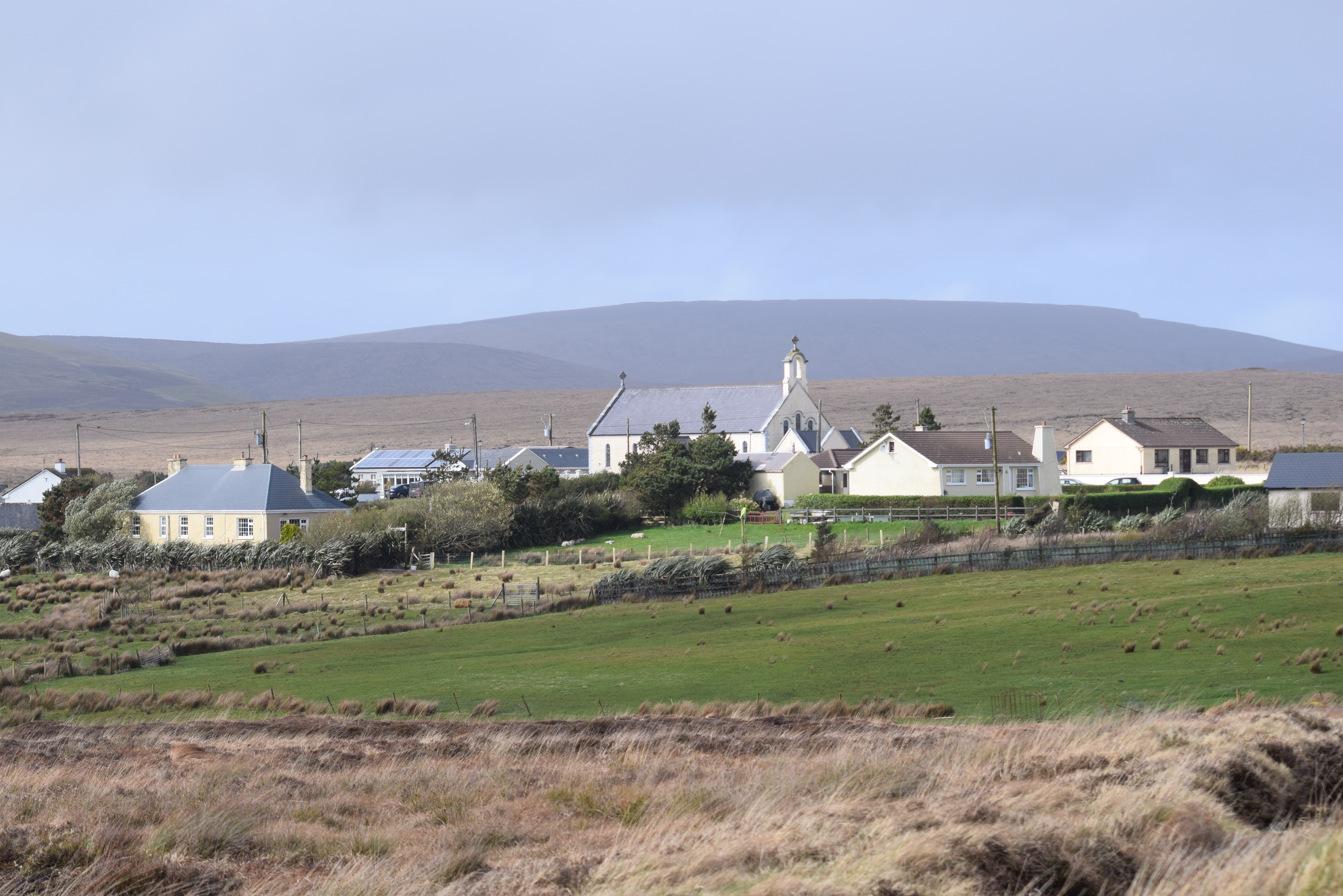
- Curraunboy

- Location in Ireland
- Coordinates: 54°18′02″N 9°46′18″W
- Country: Ireland
- Province: Connacht
- County: County Mayo

Area
  - Total: 11.5076 km^{2} (4.4431 sq mi)
- Elevation: 28 m (92 ft)

Population (2011)
  - Total: 76
  - Density: 6.6/km^{2} (17/sq mi)
- Time zone: UTC+0 (WET)
  - Summer (DST): UTC-1 (IST (WEST))
- Irish Grid Reference: F84716 40536
- As this is a Gaeltacht village An Corrán Buí is the only official name. The anglicised spellings Curraunboy and Cornboy have no official status.

Curraunboy (Irish: An Corrán Buí; also known as Cornboy, meaning "yellow crescent") is a Gaeltacht village and townland in northwest County Mayo, Ireland. It is situated in the barony of Erris and civil parish of Kilcommon. Curraunboy townland has an area of approximately 2844 acres (11.51 km²) and, as of 2011, had a population of 76 people.

== History ==
Remains of potential Iron Age settlement is recorded in an area known as the Sandhills. Thomas Johnson Westropp, who investigated the Sandhills settlement in 1912, reported that locals claimed it had been uncovered by a storm, likely the 1839 Night of the Big Wind. The sand buried the huts again until they were revealed by another storm in 1903. This settlement, northwest of the pier included numerous buildings and middens containing cockles and periwinkles.

Fr. Sean Noone in Where The Sun Sets notes that William Bald's 1812 map shows a small group of eight houses, originally the residents lived closer to the Cornboy pier, built in 1887, at Broadhaven Bay, close to an old church on a hill, but were forced to relocate due to sands that were starting to cover the settlement.

According to folklore, the advancing sands that covered the old village were believed to be the result of a curse placed upon the townland by a priest. Folklorist Michael Corduff recounted that the priest, while attempting to flee from pursuers, was betrayed by the people of Cornboy who sought to report him to the authorities for breaching the Penal Laws. Seeking refuge, the priest crossed the channel with the assistance of the people of Rossport, who offered him help.

Historically, it has been suggested that the intensification of the damages caused by the sandstorms was instead actually linked to the removal of dense coastal vegetation, which had been harvested for thatching. This clearing left the land behind more vulnerable to wind-driven sand from the sea.

A storm in 1911 blew away the roof of the old church and severely damaged its walls, the church was later rebuilt at a different location. The 1920 Ordnance Survey refers to a settlement approximately 200 yards inland from the coast near a pier.

== Geography ==
The Gweedaney River that originates in Portacloy flows through the townland. The townland consists of an area of dunes, farms and mountain bog. Within the townland are several scattered settlements including Muingalee, Cornboy, and Grennaí, where the church is located.

== Religion ==
The Catholic Church of Our Lady, Star of the Sea built between 1912 and 1913 and dedicated in 1914, is the local parish church. Architectural features include pitched slate roofs, round-headed doors, stained glass and a bell-cot.

The interior has a central aisle, timber pews, and an alabaster altar. The church retains much of its original design and fabric, and has been described as an example of early 20th-century Romanesque architecture.

== Amenities ==
There is a 9 km walk, the "Cornboy Loop" that passes through the townland. There is a community centre and cemetery in the village.

== See also ==
- List of towns and villages in County Mayo
- Townlands of Kilcommon
