= Irish lace =

Irish textile art form

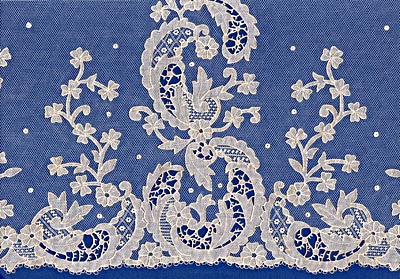
Sample of Irish Lace in Carrickmacross lace style

Irish lace has always been an important part of the Irish needlework tradition. Both needlepoint and bobbin laces were made in Ireland before the middle of the eighteenth century, but never, apparently, on a commercial scale. It was promoted by Irish aristocrats such as Lady Arabella Denny, the famous philanthropist, who used social and political connections to support the new industry and promote the sale of Irish lace abroad. Lady Denny, working in connection with the Dublin Society, introduced lace-making into the Dublin workhouses, especially among the children there. It is thought that it was an early form of Crochet, imitating the appearance of Venetian Gros Point lace.

== History ==
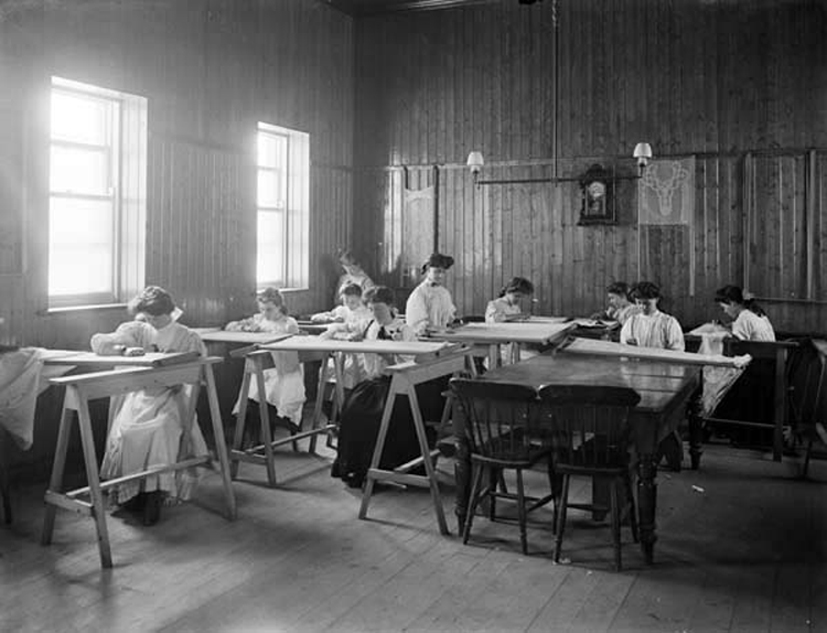
Lace-making class at the Convent of Mercy, Philip Street, Waterford

The skill of lacemaking soon spread beyond Dublin to the poorest parts of the country; it proved a popular means for young women to help support their families. Lace-making required little equipment beyond bobbins and fine cotton or linen thread, and a great deal of patience, so was suitable for remote parts of the country that had little industry and few employment options.

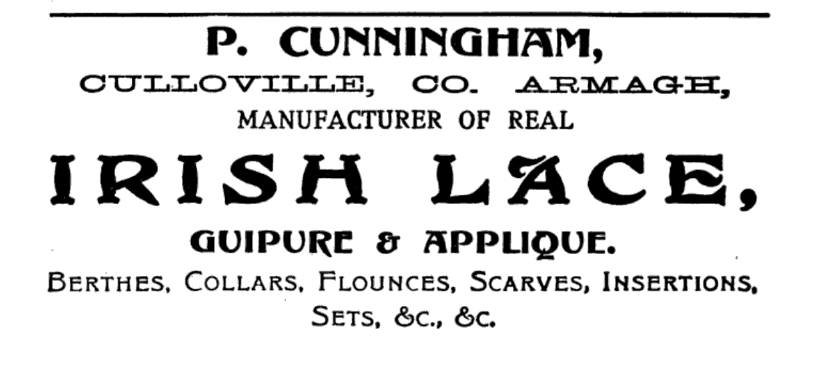
Cunningham Lace, advert, 1907, Irish International Exhibition

The lace, worn by the wealthiest women across Europe, was made by some of the poorest women in Ireland. Lace was a luxury commodity, used to decorate elaborate wedding dresses, christening robes, and church vestments; it played a vital part in saving many families from starvation and destitution. Irish lace reflects the social and political changes that took place between 1700 and the present.

Several lacemaking schools were established throughout Ireland, with some regions acquiring reputations for high-quality products. Different parts of the country produced distinctive types of lace, and discerning customers would soon learn to ask for Carrickmacross lace (County Monaghan) or Kenmare lace (County Kerry), and Youghal lace (County Cork) among others, depending upon their favoured style. Limerick lace (also known as Tambour lace, because of its manner of manufacture) became well known from the 1830s onwards. Also, see 'Headford Lace Project' for details of Headford (Galway) bobbin lace from around 1765 to 1900.

When times were hard, women had to find ways of supporting their families. This was particularly true during and after the Great Famine of the 1840s. During that time period, many Catholic nuns in Ireland were familiar with how to make Venetian lace. Because most Irish women could do needlework, the nuns realized their lace-making skills presented an opportunity to help save people from the famine. They created schools to teach many girls and women how to produce the fine crochet that has come to be known as "Irish lace."

Irish crochet and tatting travelled particularly well as the equipment needed was simple, a ball of cotton and a shuttle for tatting and a simple crochet hook and cotton for Irish crochet lace.

== Kenmare lace ==
Kenmare lace is a needlepoint Irish lace based on the detached buttonhole stitch. (It is sometimes called needle-lace to distinguish it from canvas needlepoint.) Linen thread was used by Poor Clare Order nuns to make needlepoint lace. Suitable linen thread is no longer available, so today cotton thread is used.

Kenmare needlepoint lace begins with two pieces of cloth. Over this is layered a pattern and a matt contact. Thread is laid over the top in the outline of the design and secured with a fine detached buttonhole stitch in a process called "couching". The pattern is filled in by working in from the outline. The tension makes the pattern. How tightly the stitches are pulled determines whether the pattern's stitches are open or tight. When the work is finished, the thread holding down the outline is cut, thus releasing the lace from the cloth backing.

== Carrickmacross lace ==
Carrickmacross lace was introduced into Ireland in about 1820 by Mrs Grey Porter of Donaghmoyne, who taught it to local women so that they could earn some extra money. The scheme was initially of limited success, and it was only after the 1846 famine, when a lace school was set up by the managers of the Bath and Shirley estates at Carrickmacross as a means of helping their starving tenants, that the lace became known and found sales.

== Youghal lace ==
Youghal lace was a top-quality commercial product that ended with the First World War. Lace Making was taught in Youghal in 1845 by the Presentation Sisters. Mother Mary Ann Smith reverse-engineered some Italian lace to understand how it was made. She then taught the technique to local women and thus the school of lace began.

== Limerick lace ==
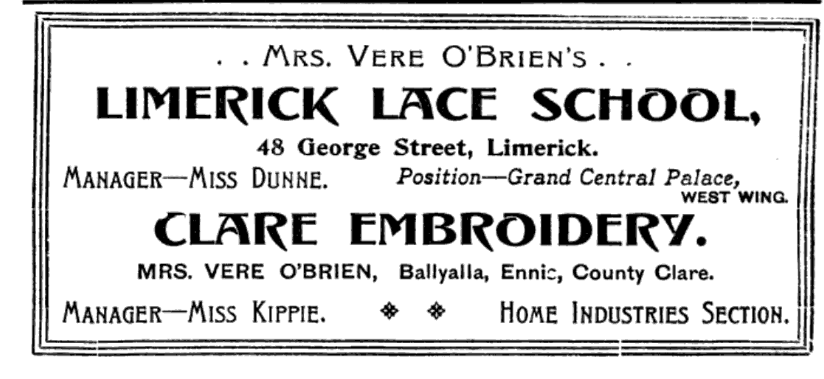
Advert for Limerick Lace School and Clare embroidery

Limerick lace (also known as Tambour lace, because of its manner of manufacture) became well known from the 1830s onwards. following the establishment of a lace-making factory in the city by an English businessman, Charles Walker, a native of Oxfordshire. In 1829, he brought over 24 girls to teach lacemaking in Limerick, drawn to the area by the availability of cheap, skilled female labour, and his business thrived: within a few short years his lace factories employed almost 2,000 women and girls.

== Irish Crochet lace ==
Irish crochet lace was developed in mid-nineteenth century Ireland as a method of imitating expensive Venetian point laces. It was initially taught in convents throughout the country and used as part of Famine Relief Schemes. Charity groups sought to revive the economy by teaching crochet lace technique at no charge to anyone willing to learn. This type of lace is characterized by separately crocheted motifs, which were later assembled into a mesh background.

== Places to see Irish lace ==
- Decorative Arts and History Museum, Dublin (in archive, not on public display)
- Sheelin Lace Museum, Co. Fermanagh
- Mountmellick Museum, Co Laois
- Carrickmacross Lace Gallery, Co Monaghan
- Kenmare Lace Museum, Co. Kerry
- Limerick Museum, Co Limerick
- Clones, Co Monaghan. Canal Stores. Cassandra Hand Center, the former lacemaking school.
- Clones Lace Museum, The Ulster Canal Stores, Clones, Co Monaghan.
