= Séamas Ó Catháin =

Irish folklorist

Séamas Ó Catháin is an Irish folklorist. He is an Emeritus Professor at the University College Dublin and was formerly the Head of School of their Irish, Celtic Studies, Folklore and Linguistics Department. From 1996 to 2005 he edited Béaloideas, the Journal of the Folklore of Ireland Society. Ó Catháin from 1975, for more than ten summers, visited and recorded the noted seanchaí ("traditional storyteller" or "bearer of the old lore") Seán Ó hEinirí for many years. A lot of material gathered on these visits was published in "Scéalta Chois Cladaigh" ("Stories of Sea and Shore") in 1983 by the Folklore of Ireland Council (Comhairle Bhéaloideas Éireann).

== Awards ==
- Gael Linn Gold Medal, Northern Ireland (1960)
- Knight (First Class) of the Order of the Lion of Finland (1986)

== Selected publications ==
- Catháin, S. Ó. (1992). Hearth-Prayers and Other Traditions of Brigit: Celtic Goddess and Holy Woman. The Journal of the Royal Society of Antiquaries of Ireland, 12–34.
- Catháin, S. Ó. (1991, March). The Irish Folklore Archive. In History Workshop Journal (Vol. 31, No. 1, pp. 145–148). Oxford University Press.

== Edited volumes ==
- Catháin, S. Ó. (2001) Editor of Northern Lights: Following Folklore in North-Western Europe (UCD Press)
- Catháin, S. Ó. (2001) Northern Lights: Following Folklore in North-Western Europe (UCD Press)

== Festschrift ==
- Almqvist, Bo, Críostóir Mac Cárthaigh, Liam Mac Mathúna, Séamus Mac Mathúna, and Seosamh Watson, (2012) Atlantic Currents: Essays on Lore, Literature and Language. Essays in Honour of Séamus Ó Catháin on the Occasion of his 70th Birthday, Dublin: University College Dublin.
