= Croly =

Croly is a surname. Notable people with the surname include:

- Daniel Croly (1846–1916), Anglican priest
- David Goodman Croly (1829–1889), American journalist
- George Croly (1780–1860), Irish poet, writer, historian and theologian
- Herbert Croly (1869–1930), American political writer and magazine founder
- Jane Cunningham Croly (1829–1901), American writer
- Trevor Croly (born 1974), Irish football coach
