= Seán Ó hEinirí =

Irish seanchaí (1915–1998)

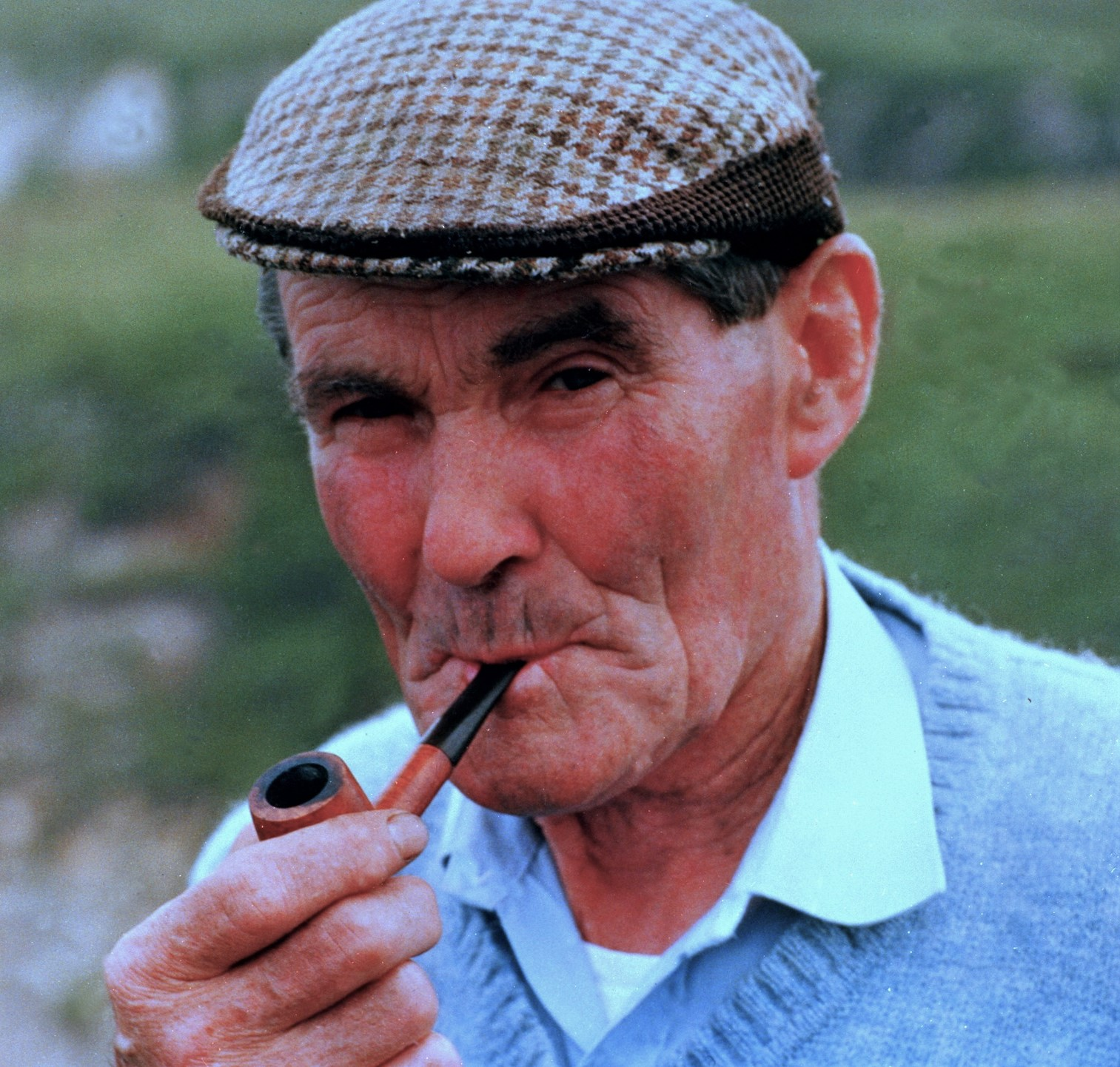
- Born: 26 March 1915; Cill Ghallagáin, County Mayo, Ireland
- Died: 26 July 1998 (aged 83); Cill Ghallagáin, County Mayo, Ireland
- Other name: John Henry
- Occupation: Fisherman
- Known for: Traditional storytelling

Seán Ó hEinirí (26 March 1915 – 26 July 1998), known in English as John Henry, was an Irish seanchaí ("traditional storyteller" or "bearer of the old lore") and a native of Cill Ghallagáin in County Mayo. He was monolingually Irish and spoke little to no English.

== Early life ==
Ó hEinirí was born in Cill Ghallagáin (Kilgalligan), County Mayo, to Micheál Ó hEinirí and Máire Uí Einirí (née Ní Chonghalaigh). He was from an early age determined to collect as many ancient legends and traditional stories as he could, describing himself as "greedy for stories." He was a currach-using fisherman, and a skilled rower.

== Contributions to the Irish language ==
He became known as a talented seanchaí, and the folklorist Proinnsias de Búrca (1904–1996) collected from him in the days of the Irish Folklore Commission (1935–1971). In later years, his stories were recorded by Séamas Ó Catháin of the Department of Irish Folklore from 1975 onwards for more than ten summers. A great deal of this work was published in "Scéalta Chois Cladaigh" ("Stories of Sea and Shore") in 1983 by the Folklore of Ireland Council (Comhairle Bhéaloideas Éireann).

Ó hEinirí also provided a large number of words and expressions to the lexicographer Tomás de Bhaldraithe, who incorporated these into his influential English-Irish Dictionary, published in 1959. In addition to this, he gave over 800 minor place-names to Patrick O'Flanagan of the Folklore Commission for the 1974 book The Living Landscape, Kilgalligan, Erris.

== TV appearances ==
Ó hEinirí was filmed for the 6-part BBC documentary In Search of the Trojan War, which was broadcast in 1985. According to the documentary, he was illiterate. He also featured on a Morning Ireland report broadcast on 25 July that year.

In 1986 Ó hEinirí featured in Episode 8 of the Emmy Award winning series The Story of English, also produced by the BBC, which discussed the Irish influence on the English language.

== Linguistic significance ==
It was estimated by Whitley Stokes that there were around 800,000 monolingual Irish speakers in 1800, which had declined to about 320,000 by the end of the famine, and to less than 17,000 by 1911. Monolingual speakers remained in the 1950s, but by the 1980s and 1990s they had all but disappeared.

== Later life and death ==
He remained in the village of Cill Ghallagáin, where he was known as a seanfhondúir ('old-timer, original inhabitant'). He died on 26 July 1998 and was survived by his wife, Máire (who died in 2001). He is buried in Kilgalligan Cemetery.
