= Daniel Croly =

Daniel George Hayes Croly (1846–1916) was an Anglican priest in Ireland.

Croly was educated at Trinity College, Dublin and ordained in 1873. After a curacies in Kilcommon and Pullathomas he held incumbencies in Killaraght, Easky and Killala. He was Archdeacon of Killala from 1904 until 1911; from 1911 to 1915.
