= Irish crochet lace =

Irish lace style

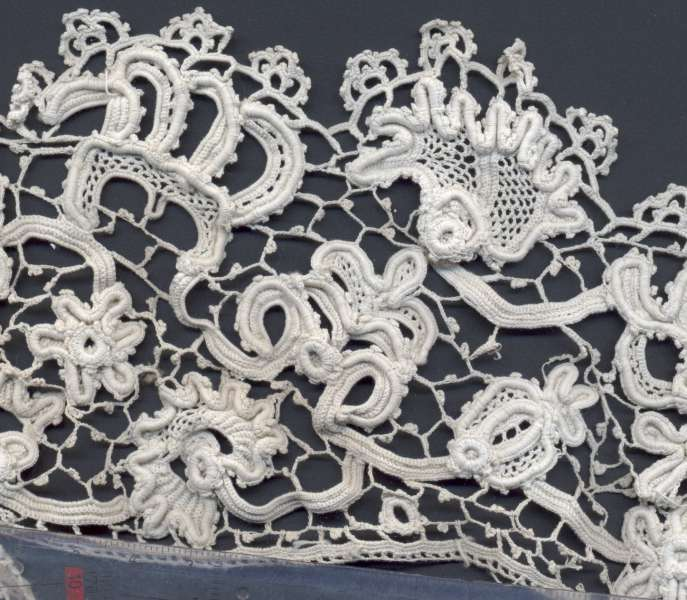
19th century Irish crochet lace

Irish crochet lace is a style of Irish lace, and a form of crocheted lace. It was originally developed in mid-nineteenth century Ireland as a method of imitating expensive Venetian point laces.

== History ==
By 1845 it was being taught in the Ursuline Convent, Blackrock, County Cork. Within a few years it was being taught in almost every convent in the country and used as part of Famine Relief Schemes while providing the means needed to emigrate. Church of Ireland philanthropic leaders also taught crochet lace as famine relief projects in the north of the country and in Kildare and Cork. By 1851, approximately 16,000 women were working in crochet.

Charity groups sought to revive the economy by teaching crochet lace technique at no charge to anyone willing to learn. This type of lace is characterised by separately crocheted motifs, which were later assembled into a mesh background. Other types of Irish crochet include Roslea and Clones lace.

== Technique ==
Irish crochet lace was traditionally made with a very fine steel crochet hook and fine crochet linen thread, though modern Irish crochet lace is made with mercerised thread. Traditionally, there are two styles of Irish crochet. One style, or fine crochet, is made up of squares or medallions, with shamrocks or roses in the centre. The other more challenging style begins with an outline or template on a piece of cloth or thick brown paper. Each motif is then crocheted separately, using cotton cord for volume and shaping. The finished motifs are then basted (sewn with a loose stitch for temporary tacking) onto a cloth in the shape of the pattern. The motifs are then joined using chains and picots. When all the motifs have been joined together to form one piece of lace, the basting stitch is removed from the back cloth, revealing the completed lace.

== Revival ==
Irish Crochet Lace, particularly Clones Lace, is experiencing a revival as modern designs are being created by Irish lace makers as well as others, such as Eastern European, Australian, Asian, South American and North American designers. Since 1990, Máire Treanor and her voluntary committee have been organising the annual Clones Lace Summer School in Clones, County Monaghan, as a gathering place for designers and students wishing to learn and preserve traditional patterns and share innovative ideas. Irish crochet lace is the original freeform crochet, with the design of each piece being individual.
