= David Shaw-Smith =

Irish filmmaker (1939–2021)

- Born: 20 January 1939
- Died: 16 January 2021 (aged 81)
- Occupation: Filmmaker

David Shaw-Smith (20 January 1939 – 16 January 2021) was an Irish filmmaker. With his wife Sally, he produced and directed the acclaimed documentary series Hands. He made over 138 television documentaries during his career.

In March 2013, 1,800 of his film cans from his archive were moved from his home and barn and put into the RTÉ Archives.

== Filmography ==
- Connemara & Its Ponies, 1971
- Dublin: A Personal View
- Village, 1974
- Hands, 1977
- Patterns, 1979
- The Angling Experience – Irish Spring Salmon, 1988
- The Angling Experience – Irish Mayfly, 1988
- The Angling Experience – Irish Summer Salmon, 1988
- The Angling Experience – Ireland's Fighting Pike, 1988

== Books ==
Ireland's Traditional Crafts (Thames & Hudson, 1984)
