= Mary O'Hagan =

Abbess in Newry and Kenmare, founder of the convent in Kenmare

- Born: Mary O'Hagan; 1823; Belfast
- Died: January 31, 1876 (aged 52–53); Kenmare
- Other name: Sister Mary Michael

Mary O'Hagan (1823– 31 January 1876), Abbess in Newry and Kenmare, founder of the convent in Kenmare.

== Biography ==
Mary O'Hagan was born in Belfast in 1823. Her parents were Edward O'Hagan, a merchant, and his wife Mary Bell, daughter of Captain Thomas Bell. Her brother was Thomas O'Hagan, later Lord Chancellor of Ireland. Their parents died when O'Hagan was young and she became the ward of her brother. They travelled as his work took him to Dublin. O'Hagan entered the convent of the Sisters of Poor Clares in Newry when she was 21, where she became Sister Mary Michael and remained there until 1861. By 1853 O'Hagan had become the abbess of the Newry convent. When a request was made for a new establishment in County Kerry, she brought six of the other nuns with her to Kenmare where they set up a school and convent. While the building work was going on they lived in “Rose Cottage” and they turned the old coach house associated with the cottage into a breakfast room where their students and local children could get breakfast before school.

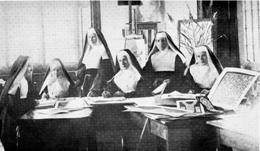
The designers of the lace photographed in 1889

While the school was being built, from the existing building once used as a work house, there was employment for the men in the area. O'Hagan set up an industrial school with courses designed to improve the local women's ability to have employment, or a trade and craft where they could sell their products. She set up classes for lace, embroidery, drawing and design for the girls. When the building of the school was completed in 1864 and there was no further work for the men, the boys were taught drawing and design, and were trained in leatherwork, woodcarving and plasterwork. By 1869 the sales figures for the goods the students were producing had reached £500 per annum. Kenmare lace or “Point d’Irelandaise” became highly sought after and popular until the end of the First World War.

However O'Hagan herself died at the Convent of the Holy Cross, Kenmare on 31 January 1876. One of her friends, one of the six nuns who initially accompanied her on the journey to Kerry was Margaret Anna Cusack who wrote her biography In Memoriam: Mary O'Hagan, Abbess and Foundress of the Convent of Poor Clares, Kenmare.
