= Barroosky =

Townland in County Mayo, Ireland

Barroosky Barr Rúscaígh
- Townland
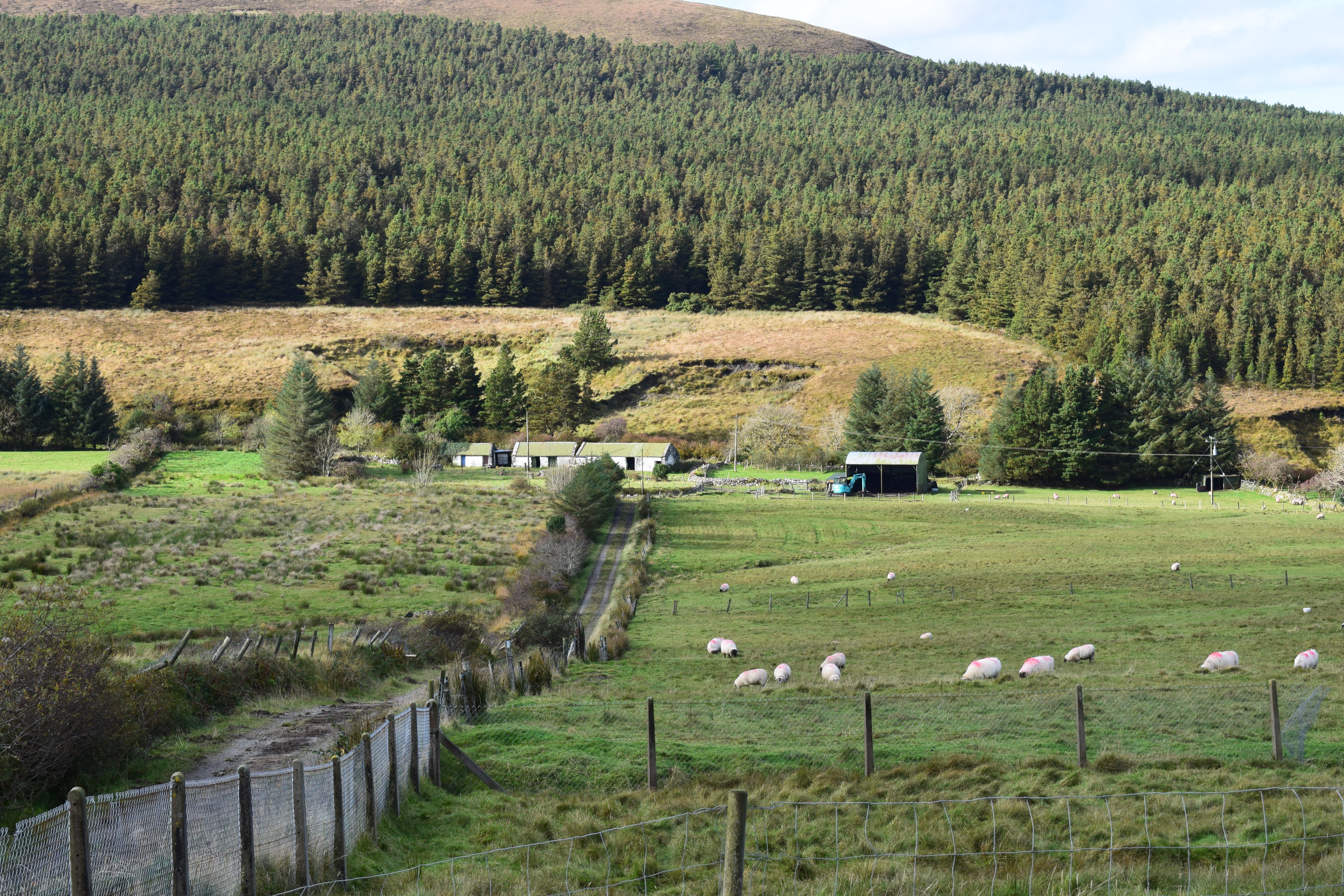
- View of Barroosky

- Location in Ireland
- Coordinates: 54°12′30″N 9°37′19″W
- Country: Ireland
- Province: Connacht
- County: County Mayo

Area
  - Total: 7.78 km^{2} (3.00 sq mi)
- Time zone: WET
  - Summer (DST): IST (WEST)
- Irish Grid Reference: F 94231 30017
- As this is in the Gaeltacht, the Irish Barr Rúscaígh is the only official name. The anglicized spelling Barroosky has no official status.

Barroosky (also spelt as Barroskey or Barrooskey. Irish: Barr Rúscaígh, meaning "top of the undulation") is a Gaeltacht townland within the civil parish of Kilcommon in County Mayo, Ireland. It is located within the ecclesiastical parish of Kilcommon-Erris. Barroosky townland has an area of approximately 1,923 acres (7.8 km^{2}).

Barroosky is also the name of the electoral division (ED) in which the townland lies. As of 2022, Barroosky ED had a population of 96 people.

== History ==
In Irish folklore, Barroosky is mentioned in the epic tale of Táin Bó Flidhais. T.H. White, an author of Arthurian novels, speculated that the area encompassing Slieve Fyagh, more specifically from the townlands of Barroosky and Srahnaplaia to Sheskin Lodge, may have been the site of the sixth-century battle of Cuil Conaire. According to White, Ailill Inbanda, a King of Connacht, was killed there during the conflict.

The area is also mentioned in a popular Erris folktale called the Fool of Barr Rúscaígh as part of the year of the French celebrations. In 1911, the population was recorded as 34.

In September 1922, during the Irish Civil War, the Battle of Glenamoy took place nearby.

== Geography ==
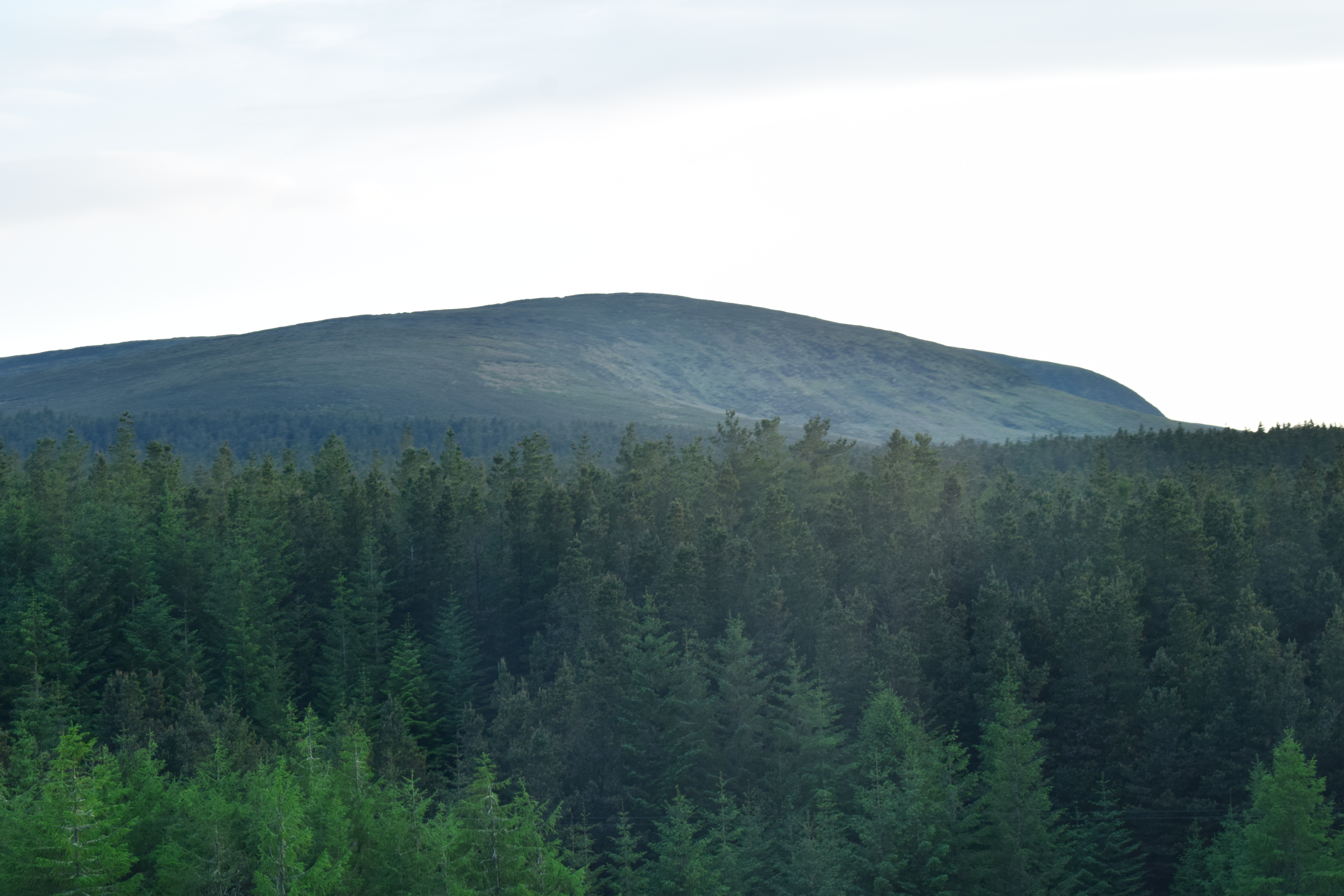
Slieve Fyagh in Barroosky

Barroosky sits in a region largely made up of peat-rich blanket bog, a landscape typical of the northern coastline of Kilcommon and the wider Erris area. The Barroosky River, which eventually flows into Glenamoy River, meanders through a valley in this area. Slieve Fyagh, a hill with a height of 335 metres, is the tallest site in the Barroosky area. The name of the hill is thought to mean either ‘mountain of the rushes’ or ‘wooded mountain’.

=== Glenamoy bog ===
The Glenamoy bog complex is located in the northwest of Erris, County Mayo, and includes parts of Barroosky. It is mostly made up of oceanic blanket bog in its inland areas.

The Belderg, Glenamoy, Glenglassra and Muingnabo rivers and numerous smaller tributaries drain the area. With little tree cover, the exposed region experiences frequent strong winds and has a wet, oceanic climate.

=== Sheskin forestry ===
Located on the blanket bogs between Bellacorick and Ballycastle, Barroosky is situated near to the Sheskin Forest. It is a conifer plantation and is not to be confused with Sheskin, County Monaghan. A hunting lodge built by the McDonnell family and later owned by the Jameson family, now in ruins, lies there.

== Demographics ==
At the time of the 2011 census, the population of the electoral division (ED) was 113, comprising 58 males and 55 females. The total housing stock was 43, of which vacant households numbered 21. With an approximate area of 48.2 km^{2}, the ED had a 2011 population density of 2.34 persons per km^{2}.

At the time of the 2016 census the population had declined to 100. By the 2022 census, the population of the area had further decreased to 96.

=== Irish language ===
According to the 2011 census, there were 61 Irish speakers in the electoral division and 5 inhabitants spoke Irish daily. By the 2016 census, 46% of the area's population were able to speak Irish. As of the 2022 census, there were 56 Irish speakers, representing an 8.2% decrease from 2011. Of these, 15 inhabitants spoke Irish daily during education only.

== See also ==
- Rivers of Ireland
- List of Special Areas of Conservation in the Republic of Ireland
