= Glenamoy River =

River in County Mayo, Ireland

Coordinates: 54°15′36″N 9°44′02″W

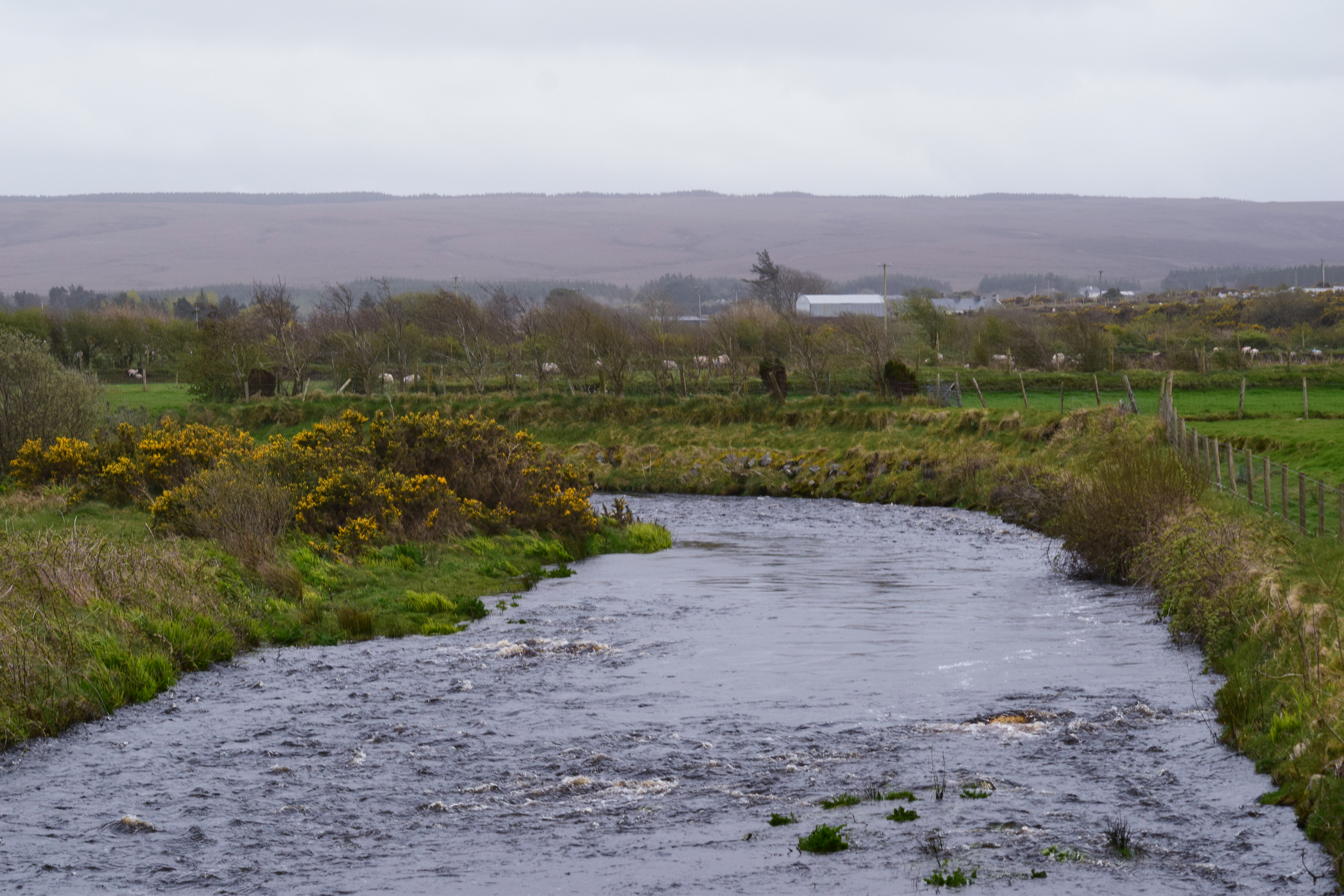
- Glenamoy River at Glenamoy, County Mayo
- Native name: Abhainn Ghleann na Muaidhe (Irish)

Location
- Country: Ireland

Physical characteristics
- Source
  - location: Glencalry, County Mayo
  - elevation: 8m
- Mouth
  - location: Atlantic Ocean via Sruwaddacon Bay
- Length: 23 km (14 mi)
- Basin size: 85 km^{2} (33 sq mi)

The Glenamoy River (Irish: Abhainn Ghleann na Muaidhe) is a river in north County Mayo, in the northwest of Ireland. It contains sea trout and salmon.

== Geography ==
The Glenamoy River rises from its source at Glencalry and Barroosky, flowing for 23 kilometres (14 mi). The river flows west through several villages including Glenamoy, reaching Gortacragher, where it meets the Muingnabo River to form Sruwaddacon Bay.

The Glenamoy River has an elevation of 8 metres. It is particularly susceptible to fluvial flooding, in flood times, the river often becomes a roaring torrent sweeping away people and cattle. There are numerous fishing pools on the river. Fishing continues in the river up to Autumn.

The area surrounding the river contains peatland and farms. The river flows through the Slieve Fyagh Bog and Glenamoy Bog Complex protected areas. A number of surveys were conducted in the river catchment by Inland Fisheries Ireland in July 2017.

=== Notable floods ===
In August 1933 after heavy rain the Muingnabo and Glenamoy rivers became swollen, cocks of hay and other debris washed downstream, three arches of the old bridge washed away due to the pressure from the rising waters.

Sunday night was a night of terror for the people of Erris, County Mayo, where crops were destroyed and bridges swept away by the heavy rains. Several people were forced to flee from their homes near Glencastle. Rain fell in a deluge from mid-day until midnight in Erris, and crops along the swollen rivers were ruined, Glenamoy bridge was swept away, dislocating traffic between Belmullet and Ballycastle.

— The Irish Times, August 29, 1933

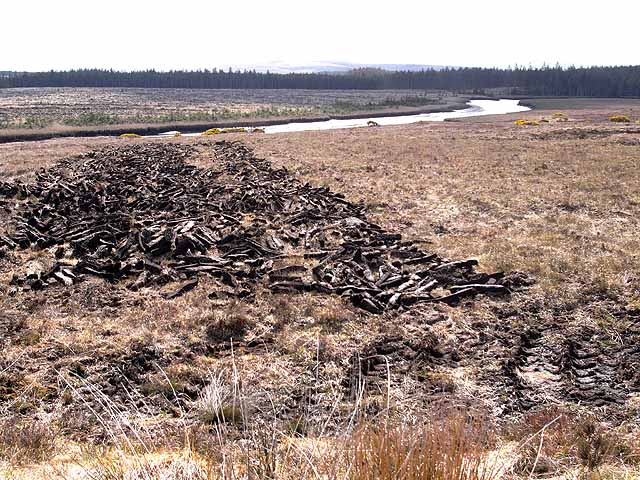
Glenamoy River upstream from Sruwaddacon Bay

== Amenities ==
A fishing club, the Glenamoy Community Angling Association, issues permits for angling on the river, which was set up in 1999. Recently, there has been an addition of a wheelchair friendly pool in the fishery.

== See also ==
- Corrib Gas Project
- List of rivers of County Mayo
- Kilcommon
