= Cill Ghallagáin =

Village in County Mayo, Ireland

- Village
- Location in Ireland
- Coordinates: 54°18′50″N 9°49′01″W
- Country: Ireland
- Province: Connacht
- County: County Mayo
- Elevation: 8 m (26 ft)
- Irish Grid Reference: F818421
- Cill Ghallagáin is the only official name. The anglicised spelling Kilgalligan has no official status.

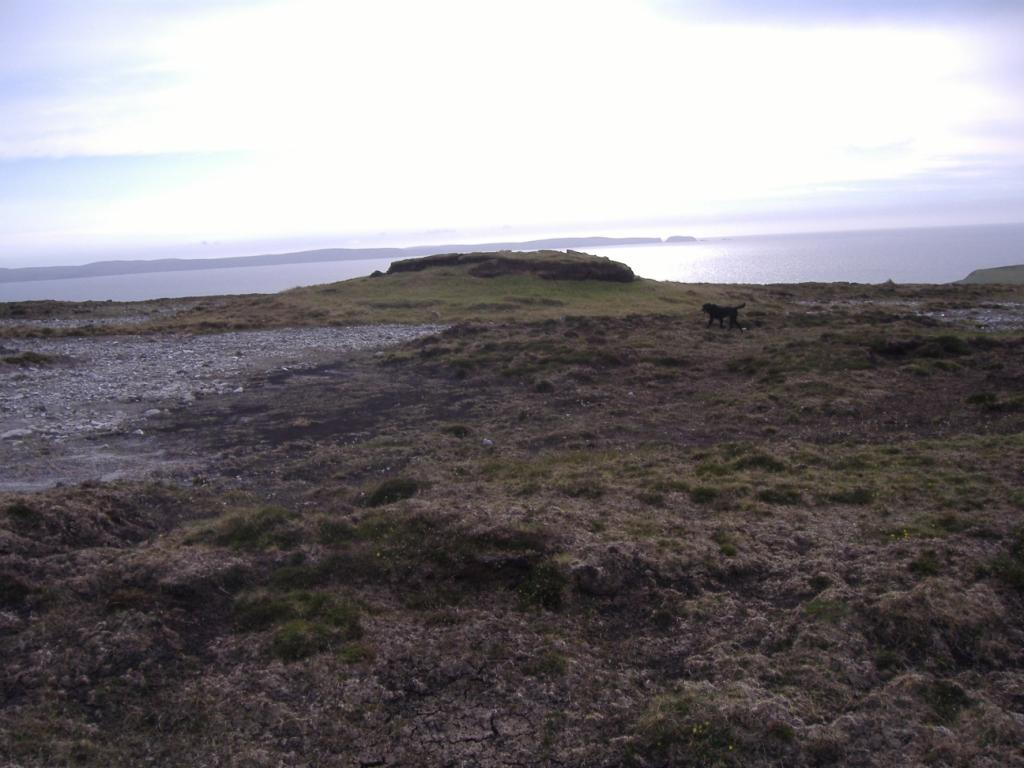
A sidheán in Cill Ghallagáin – a section of turf left uncut because of a bad feeling about cutting it

Cill Ghallagáin (anglicised as Kilgalligan) is a small Gaeltacht coastal townland and village in the northwest corner of Kilcommon Parish, County Mayo, Ireland, an area of 345 hectares (852 acres) in size. Off the northern coast of this townland lies Kid Island, an island of 13 hectares (32 acres) rising on steep cliffs to a height of 95 metres (311 ft) above sea level. The island is used for grazing sheep in the summer months. Kilcommon Parish consists of two peninsulas – Dún Chaocháin (on which Cill Ghallagáin lies) and Dún Chiortáin, to the west.

== Archaeology and history ==
This townland has many forts and ancient buildings.

In Kilgalligan graveyard which is close to the beach at Broadhaven Bay there is a large mound about which there are many stories. It has never been archaeologically investigated. It may be the remains of the early Christian church of St. Galligan, from who this townland takes its name. Galligan himself is considered to have been buried within the large cairn. Nearby is a holy well to which people come on pilgrimage on 14 August, the Eve of St. Galligan's Feast.(Corduff, Irish Folklore Commission). In the 1830s a survey reported that "the cairn was caused by accumulated burials until a sort of pyramid has been formed that, at a distance, has a curious effect with the headstones and small crosses covering all sides of its conical surface. Another writer at the time described it as "here are the ruins of a monastery".(Samuel Lewis, Topographical Dictionary)

There was a promontory fort known as Doonkeeghan (Dún Chaocháin) which probably dated from the Bronze Age. In 1318 it belonged to the De Exeter-Jordan family. The family appears to have lived in the area for a long period of time as in 1905 a Dr. De Exeter-Jordan was Medical Officer of Knocknalower dispensary on the Dún Chiortáin peninsula of the same parish – Kilcommon, Erris.

The Barrett clan built a fortified residence on the site of an earlier promontory fort in the 14th century AD. In 1580 the second husband of pirate queen Gráinne O'Malley is believed to have owned this fort, known as Doonaniron. Richard Burke owned large tracts of land along the north western coast of Erris. In 1618 the fort at Doonaniron became the property of Michael Cormuck who resided in Inver Castle on the Dún Chiortáin peninsula further west. This fort must have been an imposing structure. It had a lofty enclosing wall with a large arched gateway which was taken down by the great gale of January 1839. (Westropp, Promontory forts and Otway, Sketches in Erris and Tyrawley.)

In 1838 there was a coastguard station, a watch house, boat house and signal post at Rinroe pier.

During the Irish famine the area was badly affected and many perished. In November 1850, Robert Savage who was the postmaster at Bangor Erris wrote to Dublin Castle reporting that eighteen sheep on his farm at Cill Ghallagáin had been destroyed and several others badly injured. The police investigated but found no truth in the claim. It turned out that Mr Savage's objective was to have a police barracks built at Cill Ghallagáin. Mr. Savage intended building a fishing industry on his land at Cill Ghallagáin which he described as "a wild and mountainous district and with very disturbed neighbours and he is very scared of doing so until a police station is built on his lands". This wild townland was seen in a different light by Samuel Lewis, who claimed that "Kilgalligan Head is unrivalled in beauty and grandeur".

Seán Ó hEinirí, a well-known seanchaí and a monolingual Irish speaker, lived his whole life in Cill Ghallagáin.

== Microtoponymy ==
Cill Ghallagáin is well known for its strikingly detailed microtoponymy. Seán Ó hEinirí recalled over 800 minor place-names in this one townland in the mid-1970s. The names recorded for Cill Ghallagáin townland are mainly in Irish. They reflect the centrality of the bog, settlements, fields, caves, cliffs, coves, rocks and the history and views of the people more than a century ago. The names also reflect the transitional state of the Irish language locally in the later decades of the 19th and 20th centuries and give detailed accounts of much local folklore and beliefs. The book was researched by Séamas Ó Catháin and Patrick O'Flanagan.

Field names can be seen as representing a key to the local landscape which like the houses and yards are part of a private family space inaccessible to outsiders. The parish and the townland are knowable to the outsider – but an unknown world of fields (and rocks, hills and other hidden spaces), labelled with homely and sometimes inexplicable names, slowly emerges from the landscape and the memories of local people.

== See also ==
- List of towns and villages in Ireland
