= List of rivers of County Mayo =

County Mayo (shaded dark green)

This is a list of rivers in County Mayo, Ireland.

- Aille River
- Altaconey River
- Altderg River
- Ballinglen River
- Ballyteige River
- Belderg River
- Belfarsad River
- Belladooan River
- Bellakip River
- Bellananaminnan River
- Black River
- Boghadoon River
- Buleenshough River
- Bulken River
- Bunanakee River
- Bunanioo River
- Bundonagh River
- Bunnadober River
- Bunnaho River
- Bunnahowna River
- Bunnowen River
- Caheer River
- Camage River
- Carra River
- Carrowbeg River
- Carrowsallagh River
- Cartron River
- Castlebar River
- Castlehill River
- River Clare
- Claureen River
- Cloon River
- Cloonaghmore River
- Cloonlaghan River
- Cloonlee River
- Clydah River
- River Cong
- Cullentragh River
- Derrimurchers River
- Duvowen River
- River Erriff
- Gallaghers River
- Glasheens River
- Glenamoy River
- Glencullin River
- Glendanurk River
- Glendaruck River
- Glenedagh River
- Gleninaigh River
- Glenlaur River
- Glennamong River
- Glenthomas River
- Glenulra River
- Glenummern River
- Glore River
- Goulaun River
- Gweedeney River
- Gweestion River
- Heathfield River
- Keel River
- Keerglen River
- Little River
- Lugatoran River
- Lugayeran River
- Lung river
- Mannin River
- Manulla River
- Meander River
- Meenbog River
- River Moy
- Moyour River
- Muingnabo River
- Muingnakinkee River
- Mumkin River
- Murrevagh River
- Newport River
- Owenaglogh River
- Owenduff River
- Owengarr River
- Oweninny River
- Owenmore River
- Owennabruckagh River
- Owennadornaun River
- Owenoniny River
- Owenpollaphuca River
- Owenwee River
- Pollagh River
- Rathroe River
- River Robe
- Rossow River
- Shanvolahan River
- Skerdagh River
- Sraheens River
- Srahmeen River
- Srahmore River
- Srahrevagh River
- Sralagagh River
- Strade River
- Tarraghaghmore River
- Tobergal River
- Toormore River
- Trimoge River
- Yellow River

== See also ==
- List of rivers of Ireland
- Rivers of Ireland
