= Éigse =

- Discipline: Linguistics
- Language: Irish, English
- Edited by: Liam MacMathúna

Publication details
- Former name(s): Lia Fáil
- History: 1926–present
- Publisher: National University of Ireland (Republic of Ireland)
- Frequency: Annually

Standard abbreviations
- ISO 4: Éigse

Indexing
- ISSN: 0013-2608

Links
- Journal homepage

Éigse: A Journal of Irish Studies is an academic journal devoted to the study of the Irish language and literature. It began in 1923 as part of an initiative by the Senate of the National University of Ireland to use the Adam Boyd Simpson Fund for the publication of an Irish studies journal. This journal, called Lia Fáil, first appeared in 1926 and was edited by Douglas Hyde, professor of Modern Irish at University College Dublin (UCD). A second volume appeared in 1932, when prof. Hyde retired from UCD, later becoming the first President of Ireland. When in 1938, the fund was exclusively set aside for the publication of the journal, Gerard Murphy stepped into Hyde's shoes and changed the name to Éigse: A Journal of Irish Studies, which saw its first volume in 1939. Since then, the journal has appeared on a regular basis. The current editor-in-chief is Liam MacMathúna.

== Editors ==
- Gerard Murphy (1939–1959)
- Brian Ó Cuív (1959–1974)
- Tomás Ó Concheanainn (1975–1986)
- Pádraig A. Breatnach (1987–2010)
- Liam Mac Mathúna (2011–present)
