= Liam Mac Mathúna =

Scholar of the Irish language

Liam Mac Mathúna is an Irish scholar of the Irish language. He is an emeritus Professor of Irish at University College Dublin previously, 2006 to 2013, having been head of their School of Irish, Celtic Studies, Irish Folklore and Linguistics. He has published extensively on the Irish language, Irish literature and Irish culture. He is also the editor of Éigse: A Journal of Irish Studies.

== Selected publications ==
- Mac Mathúna, L. (2006). What's in an Irish name?. In The Celtic Englishes IV: the interface between English and the Celtic languages; proceedings of the fourth international colloquium on the" Celtic Englishes" held at the University of Potsdam in Golm (Germany) from 22 to 26 September 2004 (pp. 64–87). Universitätsverlag Potsdam.
- Mac Mathúna, L. (2007) Cabhair Choigríche: An Códmheascadh Gaeilge/Béarla i Litríocht na Gaeilge 1600–1900 (An Clóchomhar), a study of Irish/English code-mixing in literature composed in Irish 1600–1900
- Mac Mathúna, Liam (2021) The Ó Neachtain window on Gaelic Dublin, 1700–1750" Cork studies in Celtic literatures 4. Cork
