= Glenamoy =

Village in County Mayo, Ireland

Glenamoy Gleann na Muaidhe
- Village
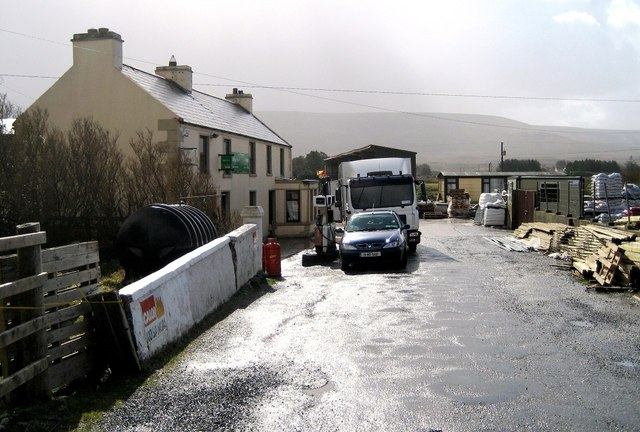
- Glenamoy post office and filling station

- Location in Ireland
- Coordinates: 54°14′26″N 9°40′45″W
- Country: Ireland
- Province: Connacht
- County: County Mayo
- Elevation: 12 m (39 ft)
- Time zone: UTC+0 (WET)
  - Summer (DST): UTC-1 (IST (WEST))
- Irish Grid Reference: F905335

Glenamoy (Irish: Gleann na Muaidhe) is a village in the civil parish of Kilcommon, Erris in the northern part of County Mayo in Ireland. The R314 road passes through Glenamoy.

Glenamoy is also an electoral division (ED) in the local electoral area of Belmullet. As of 2022, Glenmoy ED had a population of 205 people. It is a Gaeltacht (Irish speaking) area.

== Geography ==
The electoral division of Glenamoy includes the following townlands:

- Bellagelly North (Béal a Ghoile meaning "mouth of the stomach")
- Bellagelly south (Béal a Ghoile meaning "mouth of the stomach")
- Glencullin Lower (Gleann Chuilinn Íochtarach)
- Glenturk Beg (Gleann Toirc Beag)
- Glenturk More (Gleann Toirc Mór)
- Muingingaun (Moing Iongáin meaning "stream of the talons")

The townlands of Glenamoy make up the inland portion of Kilcommon parish which is, in the main, a coastal area. Much of Glenamoy is remote in nature and consists of large expanses of blanket bog. The electoral division of Glenamoy covers an area of approximately 14,500 acres (59 km^{2}).

== History ==
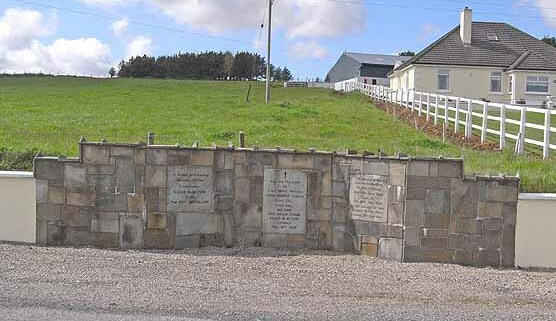
Memorial to the Battle of Glenamoy in Gortleatilla townland

Evidence of ancient settlement in the area includes a number of possible crannógs in the townland of Bellagelly North. The Record of Monuments and Places records a ringfort site in Muingingaun townland.

During the 19th century, several shooting lodges were used by the local landlords and landed gentry to host shooting parties. As of the late 19th century, a number of lace schools (associated with the Congested Districts Board) operated in the broader Erris area.

On 21 September 1922, during the Irish Civil War, a detachment of pro-Treaty National Army troops were ambushed by Anti-Treaty IRA forces at Glenamoy. Following the arrival of National Army reinforcements, a lengthy gun battle broke out - described in some sources as the "Battle of Glenamoy". In all, six pro-Treaty and ten anti-Treaty combatants are killed.

== Religion ==
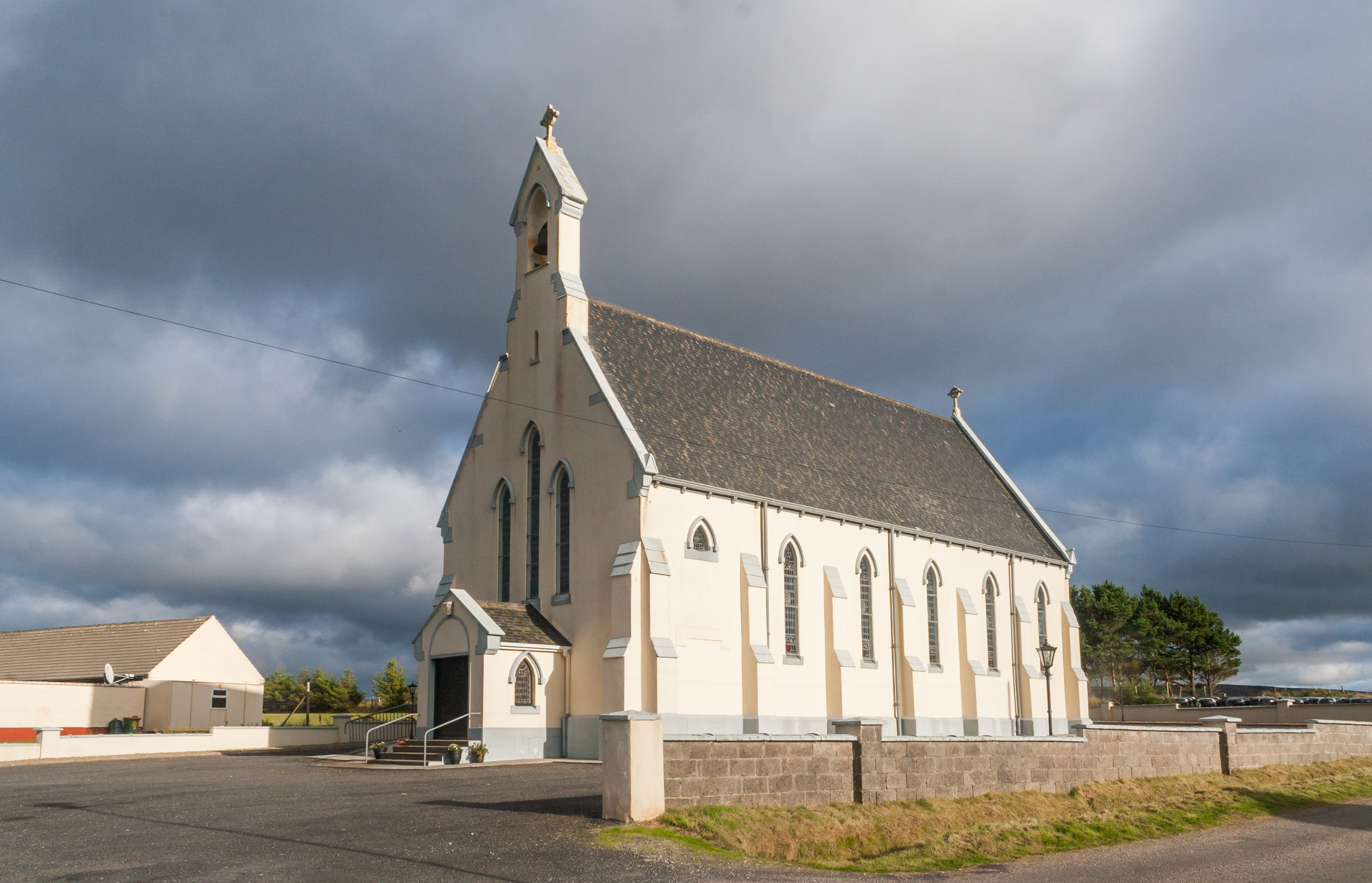
St Paul's Catholic Church opened in Glenamoy in 1936

The local Catholic church, St Paul's Church, is one of five churches within Kilcommon Erris parish in the Roman Catholic Diocese of Killala. Prior to the construction of this church, masses were held in the old school building nearby. The foundation stone for the church was laid in August 1935, and it was completed in 1936. One of the stained glass windows is attributed to Earley Studios Limited in Dublin. The church was closed for restoration in 2020, and subsequently re-opened to parishioners.

== Amenities and sport ==
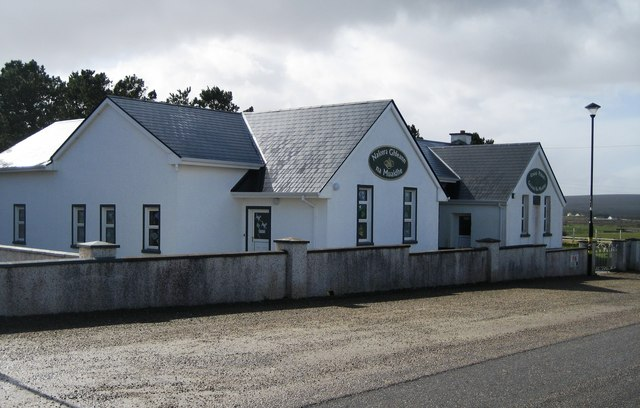
The former national (primary) school building in Glenamoy now houses a naíonra (preschool) and community centre

The area is served by an An Post post office, and adjoining petrol station. A health centre, with limited opening hours, is located nearby. The Glenamoy (Gleann na Muaidhe) Garda station also has limited operating hours. As of 2023, the Glenamoy national (primary) school, Scoil Náisiúnta Gleann na Muaidhe, had just 4 pupils enrolled.

The local Gaelic Athletic Association club, CLG Cill Chomáin, is based at Lenarevagh townland near Glenamoy.

== See also ==
- Barroosky, a neighbouring ED and townland within Kilcommon parish
