= Muingnabo River =

Coordinates: 54°15′42″N 9°43′51″W

Muingnabo River Abhainn Mhoing na Bó
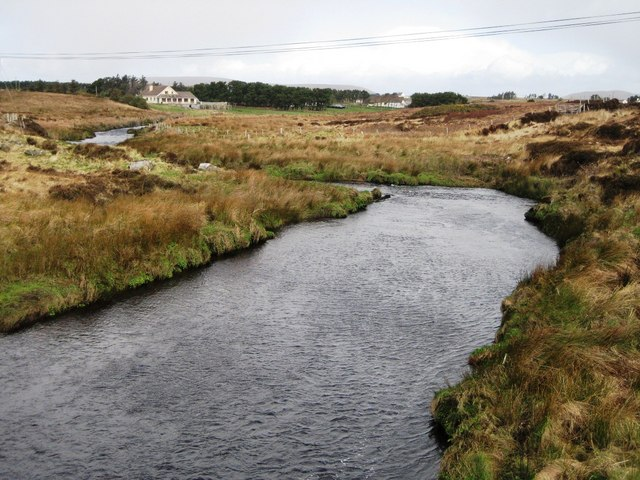
- Muingnabo River upstream from Annie Brady's Bridge
- Native name: Abhainn Mhoing na Bó (Irish)

Location
- Country: Ireland
- County: Mayo

Physical characteristics
- Mouth
  - location: Atlantic Ocean via Sruwaddacon Bay

The Muingnabo River (Irish: Abhainn Mhoing na Bó) is a river in north County Mayo, in the northwest of Ireland. It flows into the Atlantic Ocean via Sruwaddacon Bay.

== Geography ==
Sruwaddacon Bay, the Glenamoy River and the Muingnabo River are part of the Glenamoy Bog Complex Special Area of Conservation.

== History ==
Before the Great Famine (1845-1852), the Woods, a family from Yorkshire owned the townland surrounding the river. The Woods built a hunting lodge by the river, using a salmon net with a bell alert system to detect caught fish. In a nearby area, "Park na Rapa", the Woods cultivated oil seed.

A road connecting the two nearby villages of Carrowteige and Glenamoy was built in 1846. There was no bridge yet constructed over the Muingnabo River, so a fording point was used. Annie Brady, the wife of a local Fisheries Inspector fundraised for a new bridge, which was completed in 1886. The current bridge replaces Brady's bridge which was destroyed by floods in 1933.

== See also ==
- List of rivers of County Mayo
