= Kenmare lace =

Needle lace developed in Kenmare, Ireland

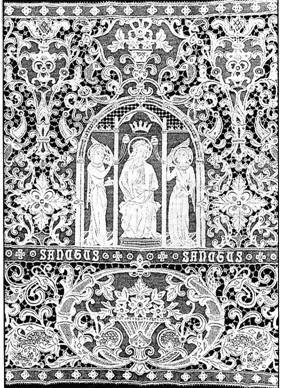
- A tabernacle veil of Kenmare Lace (1911)
- Type: Lace
- Production method: Needle lace
- Production process: Handicraft
- Place of origin: Kenmare, Ireland
- Introduced: 19th century

Kenmare lace is a handmade needlepoint lace originally made in Kenmare, Ireland. In the 19th century, sisters of the Poor Clare convent, under the leadership of Mary O'Hagan introduced needlepoint lace to the women and girls of the locality. It was a response to the poverty that followed the Great Famine. The initiative was of immeasurable help to the people of the area in those difficult years.

Its subsequent success was due partly to the indigenous skills of the local girls, who were employed to make it and partly to the foresight and guidance of the nuns and also to the early recognition and support it got from influential people of the time.

A major factor in the success of Kenmare Lace was the introduction of its own designs. Through the co-operation of the Kensington school of Design in London and the Crawford School of Art in Cork a school of design was established in Kenmare. From this school came designs that won acclaim in exhibitions around the world. Kenmare Lace graced royal functions and liturgical occasions. It gained wide recognition and acclaim for its original designs and beautiful workmanship.

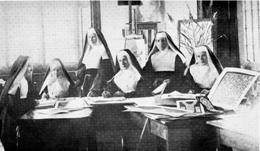
Poor Clare nuns who designed the lace (1889)

Eventually, economic factors brought about its decline and apparent demise until it was revived in 1989 by a local Co-Op in Kenmare. This came about when a local development association was formed and one of its members Nora Finnegan approached the nuns to ask them to again teach the lace to the locals. The nuns declined but offered instead to teach Nora who could instead teach the classes and so this tradition and its award-winning designs have not been lost and today they form the basis of the revival of the local skills. Kenmare Lace designs and pieces can still be seen in the Kenmare Heritage Centre and in the Kenmare Lace and Design Centre Upstairs.
