= Point de Venise =

Venetian needle lace

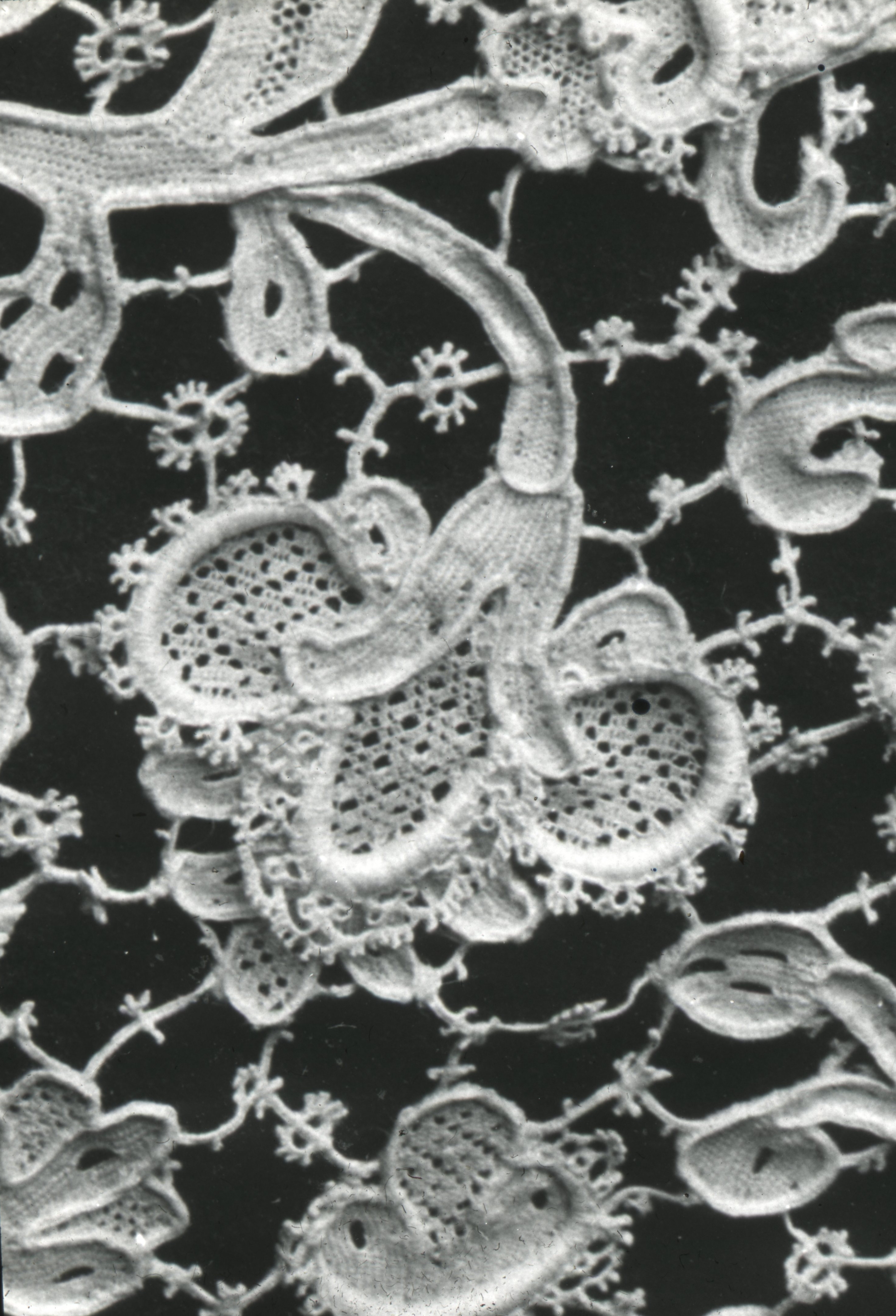
- Example of Venetian needle lace
- Type: Lace
- Production method: Needle lace
- Production process: Craft production
- Place of origin: Venice, Italy
- Introduced: 17th century

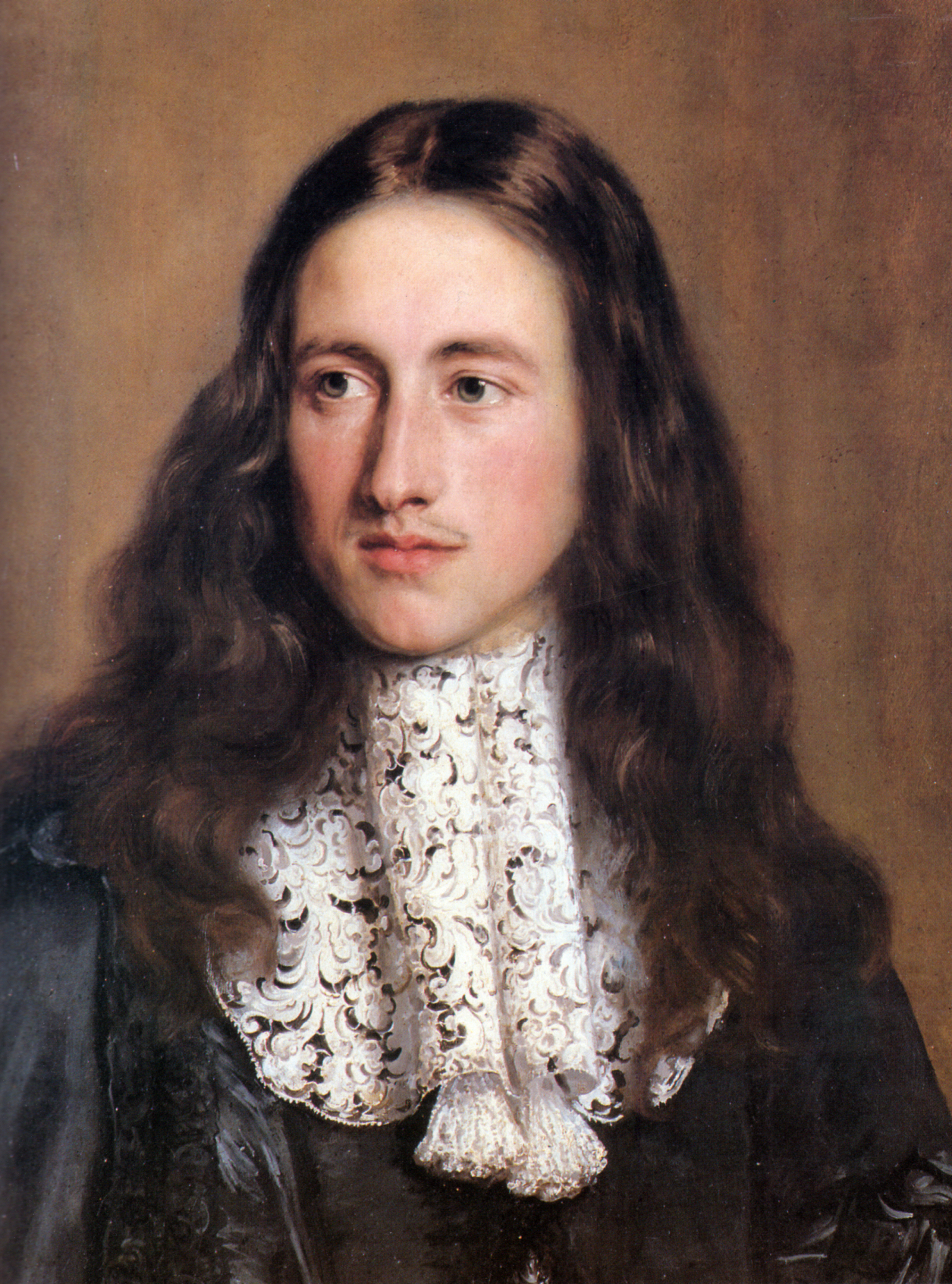
Portrait of a young man of the Chigi family wearing a gros point de Venise collar, 17th century

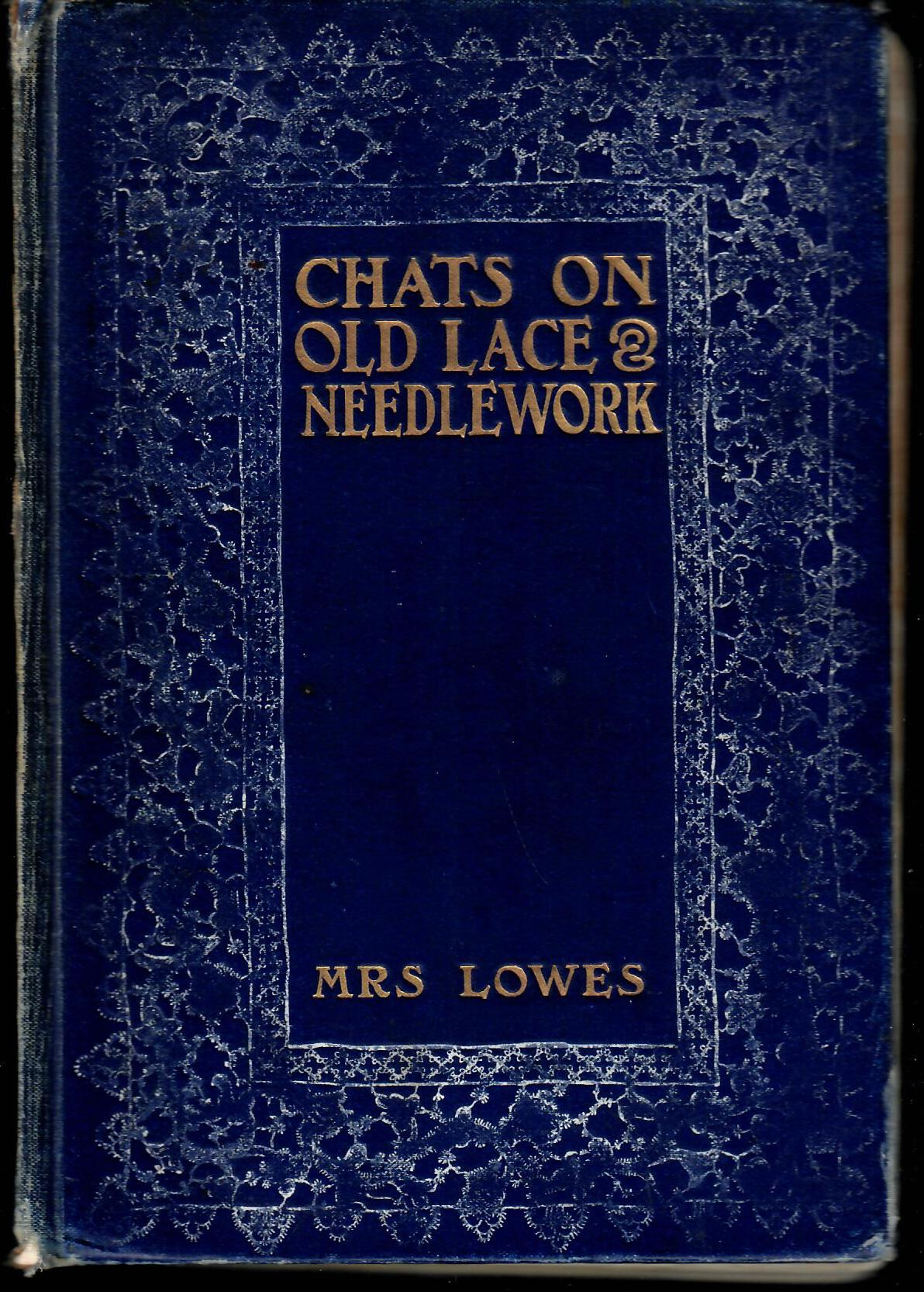
Text of some historically important and artistically interesting laces and embroidery

Point de Venise is a Venetian needle lace from the 17th century characterized by scrolling floral patterns with additional floral motifs worked in relief (in contrast with the geometric designs of the earlier reticella). By the mid-seventeenth century, it had overtaken Flemish lace as the most desirable type of lace in contemporary European fashion.

Beginning in 1620 it became separated into Venetian raised lace (which became known by the French term "gros point de Venise" or sometimes the Italian punto a relievo, "relief lace") and Venetian flat lace (in French "point plat de Venise"). The former (now known in English as "Venetian Gros Point") is characterized by having a raised pattern created through the use of cordonette worked over with buttonholing so that the curves achieved an elevated quality similar to a relief carving.

Emily Leigh Lowes, historian of lace and needlework, described the history of this textile:

It is absolutely certain that the laces known as Venetian Point originated in Italy. Pattern books still exist showing how early Reticella developed into this magnificent lace. In the National Library at the South Kensington Museum, can be seen the patterns designed by Vinciolo, Vicellio, and Isabella Parasole. These publications actually came from Venice, and being reproduced in France, Germany, Belgium and England, quickly aroused immense enthusiasm, and lace-making spread far and wide, at first all other laces being mere imitations of the Venetian.
