= Lace school =

Schools to teach lace-making until 19th century

Lace schools were common in Great Britain and Ireland from the 17th to 19th century to teach lace-making.

Lace schools were often the living rooms of small cottages and were known for being overcrowded, badly lit and often unsanitary. Girls and some boys were put to work at the age of six or seven and spent long hours bent over their pillows, learning the craft, until they could produce a marketable product. Some of the children were also taught elementary reading, but there was little other general education.

One of the earliest was in Great Marlow, set up in 1626; the 24 girls working there also knitted and spun.

At the Spratton lace school in the nineteenth century, girls started working at the age of eight. Their hours were 6am to 6pm in summer, and 8am to 8pm in winter. They were paid sixpence a day, though had to pay twopence a week in summer and threepence in winter for candles.

From the 1870s, other opportunities for girls and women meant that the numbers working in lace schools decreased.

== See also ==
- Alice Dryden, lace historian
- Elementary Education Act 1870
- Honiton lace
