= Seanchaí =

Traditional Gaelic storyteller/historian

A seanchaí (Irish: [ˈʃan̪ˠəxiː] or [ʃan̪ˠəˈxiː]; Plural: Irish: seanchaithe [ˈʃan̪ˠəxəhɪ]) is a traditional Gaelic storyteller or historian, serving as an oral repository. In Scottish Gaelic the word is seanchaidh (pronounced [ˈʃɛn̪ˠɛxɪ]; plural: seanchaidhean). The word is often anglicised as shanachie (/ˈʃænəxiː, ˌʃænəˈxiː/ SHAN-ə-khee, -KHEE).

The word seanchaí, which was spelled seanchaidhe (plural seanchaidhthe) before the Irish spelling reform of 1948, means a bearer of "old lore" (seanchas). In the Gaelic culture, long lyric poems were recited by bards (filí; filidhe in the original pre-1948 spelling) in a tradition echoed by the seanchaithe.

== Traditional art ==
Seanchaithe were servants to the heads of the lineages and kept track of important information for them: laws, genealogies, annals, literature, etc. After the destruction of Gaelic civilization in the 1600s as a result of the English colonialism, these more formal roles ceased to exist and the term seanchaí came to be associated instead with traditional storytellers from the lower classes.

The seanchaithe made use of a range of storytelling conventions, styles of speech and gestures that were peculiar to the Irish folk tradition and characterized them as practitioners of their art. Although tales from literary sources found their way into the repertoires of the seanchaithe, a traditional characteristic of their art was the way in which a large corpus of tales was passed from one practitioner to another without ever being written down. Seanchaithe passed information orally through storytelling from one generation to the next about Irish folklore, myth, history and legend, in medieval times.

The distinctive role and craft of the seanchaí is particularly associated with the Gaeltacht (the Irish-speaking areas of Ireland), although storytellers recognizable as seanchaithe were also to be found in rural areas throughout English-speaking Ireland. In their storytelling, some displayed archaic Hiberno-English idioms and vocabulary distinct from the style of ordinary conversation.

== Modern times ==
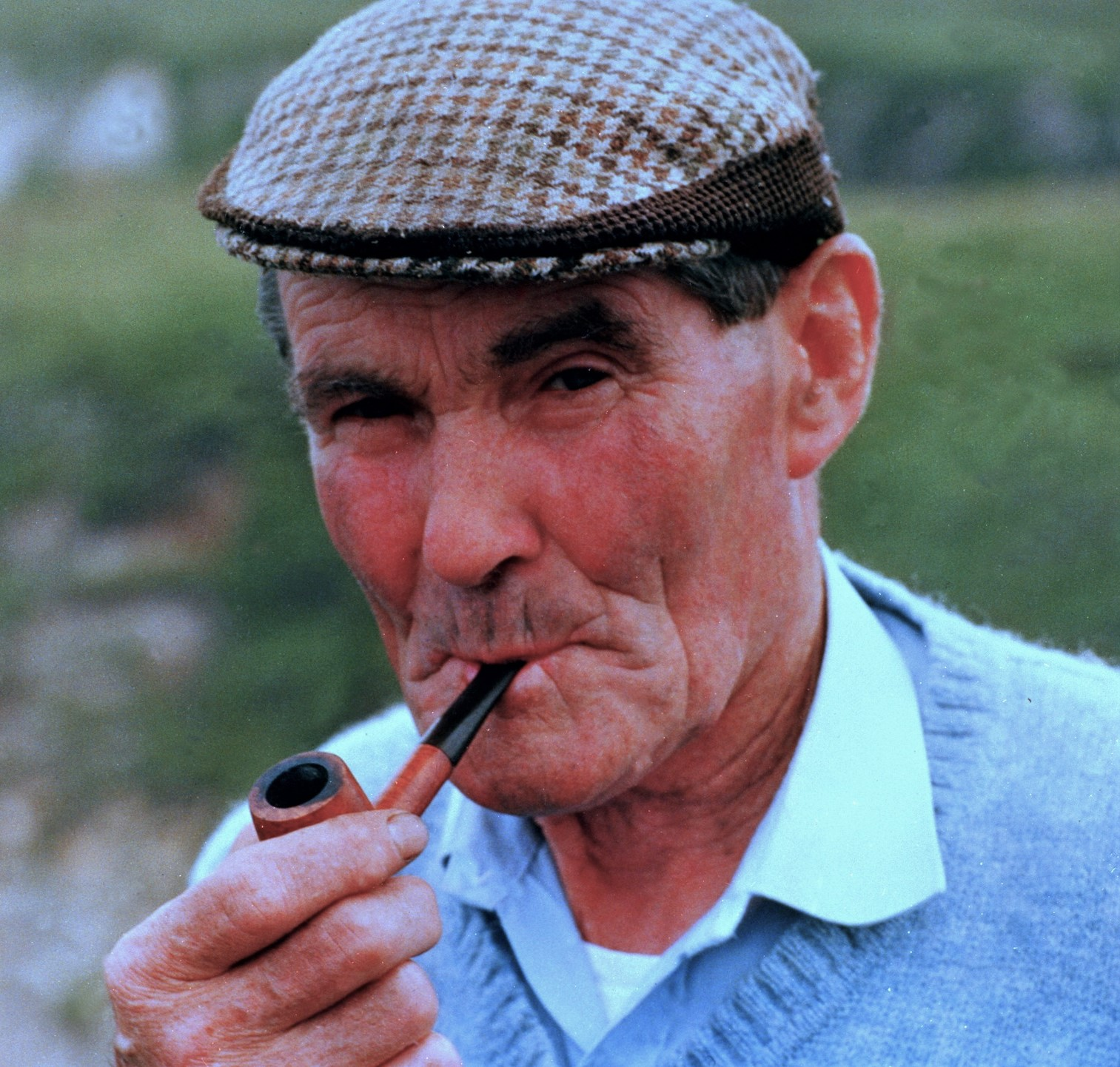
Seán Ó hEinirí, a seanchaí from County Mayo

Members of the Irish Cultural Revival took a great interest in the art of the seanchaí, and through them the stories that they told were written down, published, and distributed to a global audience.

At events such as mummers' festival in New Inn, County Galway, and the All-Ireland Fleadh Ceoil storytellers who preserve the stories and oratory style of the seanchaithe continue to display their art and compete for awards. Eddie Lenihan is one notable modern-day seanchaí, based in County Clare.

Actor Eamon Kelly was well known for his portrayals of the traditional seanachaí, and ran several series of one-man shows in Dublin's Abbey Theatre.

== Other uses of the term ==
The term is also found within Scottish Gaelic and Manx where it is spelt seanchaidh ([ˈʃɛn̪ˠɛxɪ]) and shennaghee ([ˈʃɛnaxiː]) respectively. All uses ultimately have their roots in the traditional poets attached to the households of ancient Gaelic nobility. In Scotland, it is commonly anglicised as shen(n)achie.

The Shanachies are a cricket club playing in the Inner West Harbour grade competition in Sydney.

== See also ==
- Gaelic Ireland
- Dubhaltach Mac Fhirbhisigh
