= Wiwa v. Royal Dutch Shell Co. =

Lawsuits against Shell Nigeria

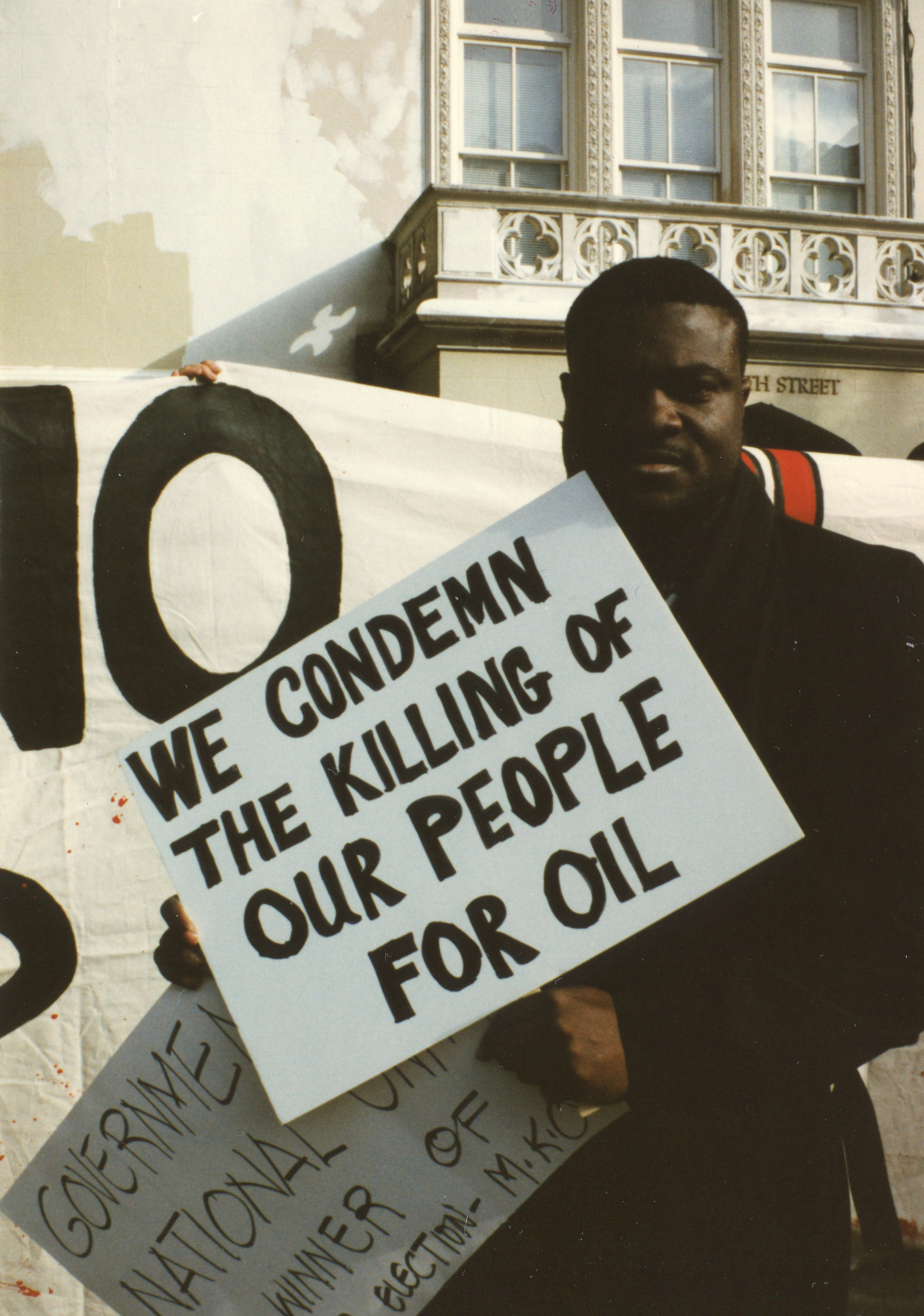
Protest in Washington, D.C. against the killing of Saro-Wiwa and others, November 1995

The Wiwa family lawsuits against Royal Dutch Shell were three separate lawsuits brought in 1996 by the family of Ken Saro-Wiwa against Royal Dutch Shell, its subsidiary Shell Nigeria and the subsidiary's CEO Brian Anderson. Charges included human rights abuses against the Ogoni people in the Niger Delta, summary execution, torture, arbitrary arrest, and wrongful death. After 12 years of Shell petitioning the court not to hear the cases, they were heard May 26, 2009.

On June 8, 2009, Shell settled out-of-court with the Saro-Wiwa family for $15.5 million.

== Background ==
The particular incidents raised in these cases were:

- the 1995 judicial hangings of the Ogoni Nine, leaders of the Movement for the Survival of the Ogoni People (MOSOP);
- the torture and detention of Owens Wiwa and Michael Tema Vizor;
- the shooting of a woman, Karololo Kogbara, who was peacefully protesting the bulldozing of her crops in preparation for a Shell pipeline, and another female protester, Uebari N-nahby by Nigerian troops allegedly called in by Shell.

American photojournalist Ed Kashi's images from the book Curse of the Black Gold: 50 Years of Oil in the Niger Delta were deposed as evidence of the human rights abuses that the oil industry, particularly Shell, has inflicted on the Ogoni people.

== Case ==
The lawsuit was filed in 1996 in the United States District Court for the Southern District of New York, and charges were made under the Alien Tort Statute, the Torture Victim Protection Act of 1992 and Racketeer Influenced and Corrupt Organizations Act (RICO). Plaintiffs were charged with complicity in human rights abuses against the Ogoni people in the Niger Delta, including summary execution, crimes against humanity, torture, inhumane treatment, arbitrary arrest, wrongful death, and assault and battery. The lawsuits were filed by the Center for Constitutional Rights (CCR) and co-counsel from EarthRights International.

== Resolution ==
On June 8, 2009, Shell settled out-of-court with the Saro-Wiwa family for $15.5 million. Ben Amunwa, director of the Remember Saro-Wiwa organization, said that "No company, that is innocent of any involvement with the Nigeria military and human rights abuses, would settle out of court for 15.5 million dollars. It clearly shows that they have something to hide".

Shell stated the payment was a humanitarian gesture and a gesture of sympathy, denying culpability in the death of Ken Saro-Wiwa and the deaths of the Ogoni Nine.

== Impact on environmental justice and corporate accountability ==
The case brought international attention to environmental destruction in the Niger Delta, increasing pressure on oil companies to adopt stricter environmental policies and community engagement practices. It highlighted the role of multinational corporations in environmental degradation and human rights violations, reinforcing calls for stronger regulations on corporate activities in resource-rich but politically unstable regions. The lawsuit set a legal precedent for holding corporations accountable for their actions abroad. Because the plaintiffs in this case demonstrated that companies could be sued for human rights abuses in foreign jurisdiction, this encouraged other affected communities to pursue legal action. A few months after the verdict, the UK Supreme Court agreed to consider additional cases from the Ogale and Bille communities against Royal Dutch Shell and SPDC over widespread environmental pollution in the Niger Delta. There has also been an enhanced focus on human rights in U.S. courts, as the ruling made it easier to bring claims based on a foreign human rights violation despite alternative forums being available.

== Ongoing environmental damage and disputed cleanup efforts ==
Despite the settlement, environmental degradation remains severe, and there is widespread contamination in water sources and soil, with some areas requiring decades-long remediation efforts. After a 2011 United Nations Environmental Programme report documented severe contamination, Shell claimed it had addressed the identified pollution. However, recent studies contradict Shell's claims, and there are sites that are visibly contaminated with the remnants of past oil spills.

== See also ==
- Bowoto v. Chevron Corp.
- Kiobel v. Royal Dutch Petroleum Co.
- Esther Kiobel
