= Movement for the Survival of the Ogoni People =

Nigerian indigenous organization

- Abbreviation: MOSOP
- Formation: 1990
- Founders: Ken Saro-Wiwa
- Type: Social Movement Organization
- Purpose: Indigenous rights of the Ogoni people
- Headquarters: Bori, Ogoni, Rivers State, Nigeria
- Region served: Ogoniland
- Members: Ethnic Minority Rights Organization of Africa (EMIROAF); Federation of Ogoni Women Association (FOWA); National Youth Council of Ogoni People (NYCOP); Ogoni Council of Churches (OCC); Council of Ogoni Traditional Rulers (COTRA); Council of Ogoni Professionals (COP); National Union of Ogoni Students (NUOS); Crisis Management Committee (CMC); Ogoni Teachers Union; Ogoni Technical Association; Ogoni Central Indigenous Authority
- President: Olu Andah Wai Ogosu
- Affiliations: Unrepresented Nations and Peoples Organization; Greenpeace International; Amnesty International
- Award: Right Livelihood Award
- Website: mosop.org

The Movement for the Survival of the Ogoni People (MOSOP), is a social movement organization representing the indigenous Ogoni people of Rivers State, Nigeria. The Ogoni contend that Shell Petroleum Development Company (SPDC), along with other petroleum multinationals and the Nigerian government, have destroyed their environment, polluted their rivers, and provided no benefits in return for enormous oil revenues extracted from their lands.

MOSOP is an umbrella organization representing about 700,000 Ogoni in a non-violent campaign for environmental justice in the Niger Delta. Peaceful demonstrations led by MOSOP and other indigenous groups in the region have been brutally suppressed by the Nigerian Mobile Police. Thousands of Ogoni were killed, raped, beaten, detained, or exiled. The Ogoni's challenge to state power was finally put down through the judicial murder of Ogoni leaders, including spokesman and founder Ken Saro-Wiwa, in November 1995.

Oil was discovered in the Niger delta in 1957. MOSOP was founded in 1990 by Ken Saro-Wiwa and Ogoni chiefs when they presented the Ogoni Bill of Rights to the Federal government of Nigeria and to the United Nations Working Group on Indigenous Peoples in Geneva.

The Ogoni protests under the leadership of MOSOP was an early and non-violent phase of the conflict in the Niger Delta.

In 1994, MOSOP, along with founder Ken Saro-Wiwa, received the Right Livelihood Award for their exemplary courage in striving non-violently for the civil, economic and environmental rights of their people.

== Background ==
The problems facing the Ogoni people have their origins in the British colonial era: the political borders of Nigeria are an artificial creation of British colonialism, with the result that nearly 300 ethnic groups are arbitrarily consolidated into a single nation-state. The Ogoni people are an ethnic micro-minority with only 500,000 people in a country of more than two hundred million. Nigerian politics are dominated by the Yoruba, Igbo, and Hausa–Fulani ethnic groups. Nigeria gained independence from Britain in 1960, and has since been mostly ruled by unelected officials from these groups. The Ogoni lack political power and constitutional protections to control their land or wealth taken from it. Other ethnic groups in the Niger Delta are also ethnic minorities.

=== Unequal distribution of oil benefits ===
Nigeria's national government is completely dependent on oil exports, with oil accounting for 80% of government revenue. Shell is the largest stakeholder, owning 47% of the national industry. The World Bank estimates that oil benefits accrue to only 1% of the general population. A 1995 Human Rights Watch interview with attorney Uche Onyeagocha documented that minority groups whose land is the source of over 90% of Nigeria's oil opposed the prevailing formula for allocating oil revenues, under which the federal, state, and local governments had almost complete discretion over the distribution of oil proceeds.

By 1995, Ogoniland hosted six oil fields, two oil refineries, and fertilizer and petrochemical plants. MOSOP estimated that $30 billion worth of oil had been extracted from their land within 30 years of discovered reserves, and they had received no benefits but borne the ecological damages of oil production including numerous spills; constant flaring of natural gas; and dumping of toxic waste.

==== Corruption ====
Former World Bank Vice-President for Africa, Dr. Oby Ezekwesili, estimated that $400 billion of Nigeria's oil revenue was stolen or misspent from 1960 to 1999. A Nigerian anti-corruption agency estimated that around 70% of oil revenues were wasted or lost to corruption. Nuhu Ribadu's Task Force on Oil Revenue found that approximately $29 billion in oil and gas revenues were lost over a period of ten years from cut price deals struck between multinational oil companies and government officials. The report alleges international oil traders sometimes buy crude without any formal contracts, and the state oil firm had short-changed the Nigerian treasury by selling crude oil and gas to itself below market rates.

=== Environmental issues in the Niger Delta ===
Beginning in the late 1950s, multinational oil companies began taking over land belonging to Indigenous farming and fishing communities in the Niger Delta, resulting in environmental devastation. MOSOP spokesman Ken Saro-Wiwa called it an 'ecological war':

The Ogoni country has been completely destroyed.... Oil blowouts, spillages, oil slicks, and general pollution accompany the search for oil.... Oil companies have flared gas in Nigeria for the past thirty three years causing acid rain.... What used to be the bread basket of the delta has now become totally infertile. All one sees and feels around is death. Environmental degradation has been a lethal weapon in the war against the indigenous Ogoni people.

Both Shell and Chevron have operated oil wells in Ogoniland.

==== Oil spills ====
Statistics from the Department of Petroleum Resources (DPR) indicate that between 1976 and 1996 a total of 4,835 incidents resulted in the spillage of at over 2.4 million barrels of oil (102.7 million U.S. gallons), of which an estimated 1.9 million barrels (79.7 million U.S. gallons; 77 percent) were lost to the environment. Nigeria's largest spill was an offshore well blowout in January 1980, when at least 200,000 barrels of oil (8.4 million U.S. gallons), according to oil industry sources, spewed into the Atlantic Ocean from a Texaco facility and destroyed 340 hectares (840 acres) of mangroves. Mangrove forest is particularly vulnerable to oil spills, because the soil soaks up the oil like a sponge and re-releases it every rainy season. DPR estimated that more than 400,000 barrels (16.8 million U.S. gallons) were actually spilled in this incident. Water contamination of local water supply resulted in fish kills and ruinous effects on farmland.

==== Gas flaring ====
Nigeria flares more natural gas associated with oil extraction than any other country, with estimates about 70% is wasted by flaring. This is the equivalent to 40% of Africa's gas consumption in 2001. Statistical data associated with gas flaring are notoriously unreliable, but Nigeria may waste US$2 billion per year by flaring associated gas. Flaring is done, because it is costly to separate commercially viable associated gas from the oil. Companies operating in Nigeria also harvest natural gas for commercial purposes but prefer to extract it from deposits where it is found in isolation as non-associated gas. Thus associated gas is burned off to decrease costs.

Gas flares are potentially harmful to nearby communities, as they release poisonous chemicals including nitrogen dioxides, sulphur dioxide, volatile organic compounds, as well as carcinogens. These chemicals can aggravate asthma, cause breathing difficulties and pain, as well as chronic bronchitis.

Gas flares are often close to communities and regularly lack fencing or protection for villagers who risk working near their heat. Many communities claim that nearby flares cause acid rain which corrodes their homes and other structures, many of which have zinc-based roofing. Some people resort to using asbestos-based material, which is stronger in repelling acid rain deterioration. Unfortunately, asbestos exposure increases the risk of forming lung cancer, pleural and peritoneal mesothelioma, and asbestosis.

==== Effects on Ogoni people ====
In describing the effects of these environmental damages upon his people, the President of MOSOP, Dr. Garrick Barile Leton stated in 1991 that,

Lands, streams and creeks are totally and continually polluted; the atmosphere is for ever charged with hydrocarbons, carbon monoxide and carbon dioxide; many villages experience the infernal quaking of the wrath of gas flares which have been burning 24 hours a day for 33 years; acid rain, oil spillages and blowouts are common. The result of such unchecked environmental pollution and degradation are that (i) The Ogoni can no longer farm successfully. Once the food basket of the eastern Niger Delta, the Ogoni now buy food (when they can afford it); (ii) Fish, once a common source of protein, is now rare. Owing to the constant and continual pollution of our streams and creeks, fish can only be caught in deeper and offshore waters for which the Ogoni are not equipped. (iii) All wildlife is dead. (iv) The ecology is changing fast. The mangrove tree, the aerial roots of which normally provide a natural and welcome habitat for many a sea food – crabs, periwinkles, mudskippers, cockles, mussels, shrimps and all – is now being gradually replaced by unknown and otherwise useless plants. (v) The health hazards generated by an atmosphere charged with hydrocarbon vapour, carbon monoxide and carbon dioxide are innumerable.

==== Early protests ====
In 1970, Ogoni Chiefs and Elders of the Ogoni Divisional Commission (W. Nzidee, F. Yowika, N. Ndegwe, E. Kobani, O. Nalelo, Chief A. Ngei and O. Ngofa), submitted a petition to the local Military Governor as a formal complaint against Shell, then operating a joint venture with BP. It brought notice that the company was "seriously threatening the well-being, and even the very lives" of the Ogoni.

Shell's response was that the petition was an attempt to place development and other responsibilities on the company and that the "contentions ... bear little relation to what is actually taking place".

In July 1970, there was a major blow-out at the Bomu oil field in Ogoni, which continued for three weeks, causing widespread pollution and outrage. P. Badom, of the Dere Youths Association, issued a letter of protest, stating:

"Our rivers, rivulets and creeks are all covered with crude oil. We no longer breathe the natural oxygen, rather we inhale lethal and ghastly gases. Our water can no longer be drunk unless one wants to test the effect of crude oil on the body. We no longer use vegetables, they are all polluted."

The Iko people wrote to Shell in 1980 demanding "compensation and restitution of our rights to clean air, water and a viable environment where we can source for our means of livelihood".

In 1987, when the Iko once again held a peaceful demonstration against Shell, the Mobile Police Force (MPF) destroyed 40 houses, and 350 people were made homeless.

== History ==
MOSOP was the outgrowth of such protests during the 1970s and 1980s. Ken Saro-Wiwa initiated the idea of MOSOP and attracted a mix of educated Ogoni elites and chiefs, including its first president Dr. Garrick Barile Leton. Goodluck Diigbo, President of the National Youth Council of Ogoni People, (NYCOP) established seven of the ten affiliates that made up MOSOP. Chief E. N. Kobani became vice president of MOSOP.

MOSOP's first effort was the 1990 Ogoni Bill of Rights addressed to the federal government, the people of Nigeria, and as an appeal to the international community. The Ogoni demands were: political autonomy to participate in the affairs of the Republic as a distinct and separate unit, provided that this autonomy guaranteed political control of Ogoni affairs by Ogoni people; the right to control and use a fair proportion of Ogoni economic resources for Ogoni development; adequate representation in Nigerian national institutions; and the right to protect the Ogoni environment and ecology from further degradation. Military president Ibrahim Babangida, made no reply to these demands.

=== Ogoni Bill of Rights ===
In August 1990, the Ogoni elders signed the Ogoni Bill of Rights, demanding "political control of Ogoni affairs by Ogoni people, control and use of Ogoni economic resources for Ogoni development, adequate and direct representation as a right for Ogoni people in all Nigerian national institutions, and the right to protect the Ogoni environment and ecology from further degradation."

MOSOP presented the Bill of Rights to several parties: the Federal government of Nigeria; the United Nations Working Group on Indigenous Peoples in Geneva; the UN sub-committee on Human Rights; the African Commission on Human and Peoples' Rights; and Greenpeace. The Ogoni case was also presented to the Unrepresented Nations and Peoples Organization in 1993.

They also stated that Shell bore “full responsibility for the genocide of the Ogoni.”

The Bill summaraised the sufferings of the Ogoni peoples and their political marginalisation and neglect by the government. They also defined themselves as "a separate and distinct ethnic nationality", and demanded participation in national affairs as "a distinct and separate unit".

The Ogoni Bill of Rights stated that:

The Ogoni people will make representation to the World Bank and the International Monetary Fund to the effect that giving loans and credit to the Nigerian Government on the understanding that oil money will be used to repay such loans is to encourage the Nigerian government to continue to dehumanise the Ogoni people and to devastate the environment and ecology of the Ogoni and other delta minorities among whom oil is found. The Ogoni people will inform the United Nations and the Organisation of African Unity that the Nigerian Constitution and the actions of the power elite in Nigeria flagrantly violate the UN Declaration of Human Rights and the African Charter of Human and Peoples Rights; and that Nigeria in 1992 is no different from Apartheid South Africa. The Ogoni people will ask that Nigeria be duly chastised by both organizations for its inhuman actions and uncivilized behaviour. And if Nigeria persists in its perversity, then it should be expelled from both organizations.

=== Early uprisings 1990–93 ===
==== Umuechem protests ====
In late October 1990, protests at a Shell facility in the Umuechem community of Etche brought the situation in the Niger Delta to international attention. In anticipation of the protests, Shell requested the presence of the paramilitary MPF, who killed approximately 80 unarmed demonstrators and destroyed or severely damaged 495 houses. A government inquiry later found that villagers posed no threat and concluded that the MPF's violence was in "reckless disregard for lives and property.”

==== Ogoni uprising ====
From 1990 to 1993, MOSOP responded to the failure of previous petitions to elicit a response from the government or the oil companies by increasingly asserting their right to self-determination and their right to confront the oil companies directly. MOSOP leaders campaigned amongst various local clans and mounted media campaigns, promising monetary compensation for damages if their campaign succeeded.

In 1992, the conflict escalated as MOSOP demanded that Shell Petroleum Development Company (SPDC), Chevron, and the Nigerian National Petroleum Corporation (NNPC), pay $10 billion in compensation to Ogoni people, immediately stop environmental degradation, and negotiate with Ogoni people to reach acceptable terms for further oil extraction. If the companies failed to comply within 30 days, the Ogonis threatened mass action to disrupt their operations. By this act, the Ogonis shifted the focus of their actions from an unresponsive federal government to oil companies actively engaged in their own region.

===== Shell withdrawal =====
In January 1993, the national government responded by banning public gatherings and declaring that disturbances of oil production were acts of treason. In spite of the ban, MOSOP went ahead with a massive public mobilization on 4 January 1993. The event, called the first Ogoni Day, attracted about 300,000 people in massive festivities. Saro-wiwa and other MOSOP leaders were arrested. Over the next month as the mobilization continued, a Shell employee was beaten by an Ogoni mob. As a security measure, Shell Petroleum Development Company withdrew its employees from Ogoniland. Oil extraction from the territory slowed to 10,000 barrels per day (1,600 m^{3}/d) (.5% of the national total).

In June 1993, the Ogoni boycotted presidential elections.

===== Ogoni-Andoni violence =====
On 9 July, at least 60 Ogoni people were killed, allegedly by Andoni, when arriving back from the Cameroon Republic by boat. This "incident" marked the beginning of Ogoni-Andoni violence. On 5 August, Kaa became the first village attacked in the Andoni-Ogoni conflict, resulting in 33 deaths and 8,000 refugees. Over the coming months, similar incidents occurted in over 20 other villages. MOSOP accuses Shell of being behind the Andoni-Ogoni violence.

=== Execution of Ken Saro-Wiwa and the Ogoni Nine (1994) ===
On 21 May 1994, four Ogoni chiefs (all on the conservative side of a schism within MOSOP over strategy) were murdered. Saro-Wiwa (head of the radical faction), was detained in connection with the killings, although he had been denied entry to Ogoniland on the day of the murders. Rivers State Military Administrator Lt. Col. Dauda Komo did not wait for a judicial investigation to blame the killings on "irresponsible and reckless thuggery of the MOSOP element".

Witnesses said that Rivers State Internal Security engaged in terror operations against the general Ogoni population while claiming to search for people responsible for the killings of the four Ogoni leaders. Amnesty International characterized the policy as deliberate terrorism. By mid-June, 30 villages had been completely destroyed, 600 people had been detained, and at least 40 had been killed. An eventual total of around 100,000 internal refugees and an estimated 2,000 civilian deaths was recorded.

==== Arrest and summary execution of Ogoni nine ====
Ken Saro-Wiwa, N. G. Dube, and Kobari Nwilewas were arrested in Port Harcourt on 21 June 1993. The three were charged on 13 July 1993 with six counts relating to unlawful assembly, seditious intention and seditious publication. Bail was not set and all three remanded in custody until 20 September.

On 10 November 1995, nine activists from the movement, Barinem Kiobel, John Kpunien, Baribor Bera, Saturday Dobee, Felix Nwate, Nordu Eawo, Paul Levura, and Daniel Gbokoo along Ken Saro-Wiwa, were hanged 10 days after being convicted by the Nigerian government on charges of "incitement to murder" of the four Ogoni leaders. In the final address to the military-appointed tribunal, Saro-Wiwa describes the actions of Shell Corporation as war crimes against the Ogoni People:

I repeat that we all stand before history. I and my colleagues are not the only ones on trial. Shell is here on trial and it is as well that it is represented by counsel said to be holding a watching brief. The Company has, indeed, ducked this particular trial, but its day will surely come and the lessons learnt here may prove useful to it for there is no doubt in my mind that the ecological war that the Company has waged in the Delta will be called to question sooner than later and the crimes of that war be duly punished. The crime of the Company's dirty wars against the Ogoni people will also be punished.

Excerpt from: Trial Speech of Ken Saro-Wiwa – via Wikisource.

An anonymous interview revealed a first hand telling of that day and the events that took place;

Everywhere was quiet and then on the morning of May 21st ... as we woke up in the morning most of the Ogoni communities were filled with soldiers and mobile policemen armed with sophisticated weapons. We don’t (sic) know why they just came, it was only when four prominent Ogoni sons were killed later in the afternoon of that day that we in Ogoni ever knew that there was a grand design to cause disturbances in Ogoni in order to create an excuse for the government to send in more troops

==== International response ====
Saro-Wiwa's death provoked international outrage and the immediate suspension of Nigeria from the Commonwealth of Nations as well as the withdrawal of many foreign diplomats from Nigeria. According to the Nigerian Medical Association's President, these were the fastest executions in the West African nation's history. Nigerian human rights activists and opposition groups had long urged the Commonwealth and the United States to impose economic sanctions on the Nigerian government. This they argued was the opportune time to "turn the screws on" Nigeria's military government by boycotting its oil. The United States, which buys half of Nigeria's oil, declined through a press statement.

=== 1994–present ===
On 4 January 1994, Ogoni national day, the Rivers State Internal Security Task Force (RVISTF), arrested dozens of activists and raided several villages.

==== Saro-Wiwa vs. Shell ====
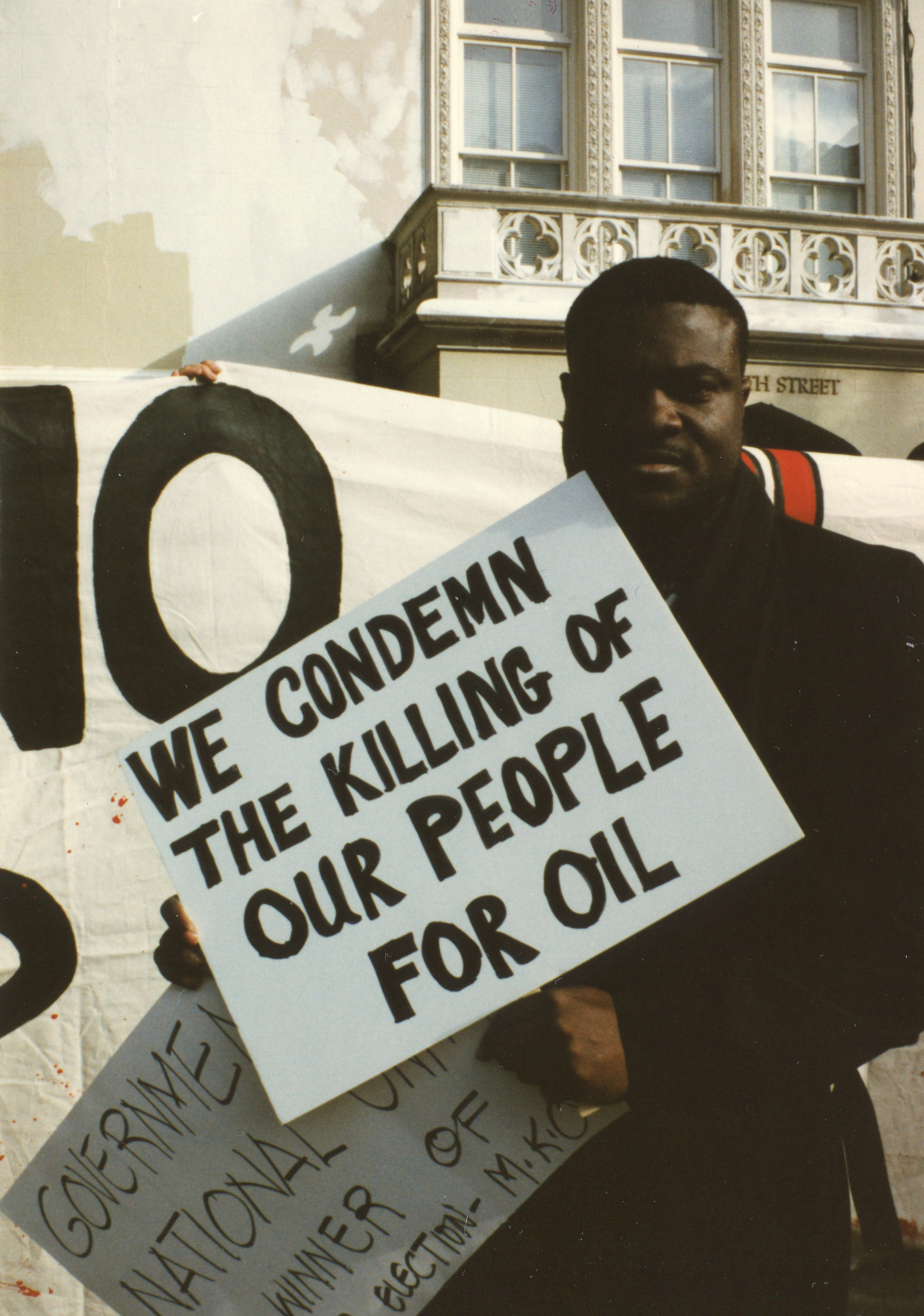
Protest in Washington, D.C. against the killing of Saro-Wiwa and others, November 1995

The Wiwa family lawsuits against Royal Dutch Shell were three separate lawsuits brought in 1996 by the family of Ken Saro-Wiwa against Royal Dutch Shell, its subsidiary Shell Nigeria and the subsidiary's CEO Brian Anderson. Charges included human rights abuses against the Ogoni people in the Niger Delta, summary execution, torture, arbitrary arrest, and wrongful death. After 12 years of Shell petitioning the court not to hear the cases, they were heard May 26, 2009.

On June 8, 2009, Shell settled out-of-court with the Saro-Wiwa family for $15.5 million.

==== Demands for Saro-Wiwa's exoneration ====
On 10 November 2014, MOSOP President Legborsi Saro Pyagbara, at the 19th anniversary commemoration of the "Ogoni Martyrs" held in Port Harcourt, Rivers State, called on the federal government to clear the late activist, Ken Saro-Wiwa, and the other nine Ogoni people executed by General Sani Abacha's government for murder. Pyagbara recalled that the UN, which monitored the trial of Saro-Wiwa and the Ogoni Nine, observed that the returned verdict did not follow any known local or international standard.

Compelling new evidence suggests the Nigerian military killed four Ogoni elders whose murders led to the execution of the playwright and activist Ken Saro-Wiwa in 1995. The evidence also reveals that the notorious military commander Lieutenant-Colonel Paul Okuntimo, whose troops were implicated in other crimes, was in the pay of Shell at the time of the killings and was driven around in a Shell vehicle.

== See also ==
- Environmental racism
- Kiobel v. Royal Dutch Petroleum Co. (related 2013 US Supreme Court case)
- Esther Kiobel
- Shell to Sea
- Third World Approaches to International Law
