= Esther Kiobel =

Esther Kiobel is a Nigerian activist and the lead plaintiff in the 2013 Supreme Court Case Kiobel v. Royal Dutch Petroleum Co. After the wrongful execution of her husband, Barinem Kiobel, Esther moved to the United States of America and began a campaign to sue the Royal Dutch Shell corporation for their supposed complicity in the execution. She additionally served as the plaintiff in cases before the New York District Court, the 2nd Circuit Court of Appeals, and The Hague.

== Historical background ==
In the late 1930s, the oil company Royal Dutch Shell took root in Nigeria near the once untouched waterways of the Niger Delta. Over the following six decades, Big Oil corporations refused to acknowledge their pollution, which has been linked to widespread pollution, economic disruption, and severe human rights concerns. Despite repeated promises of reform and cleanup, the legacy of crude oil extraction in the Niger Delta remains one of environmental neglect and social injustice. The Niger Delta is one of Africa's most ecologically diverse regions, home to vast wetlands, mangrove forests, and numerous communities that rely heavily on natural resources for survival. Prior to oil exploration, local populations sustained themselves through fishing and agriculture. However, the introduction of large-scale oil extraction fundamentally altered this way of life. According to environmental research, Shell's operations since the 1950s have caused extensive damage to ecosystems, particularly through oil spills, gas flaring, and pipeline leaks. These activities have contaminated soil and water systems, making farming and fishing difficult or impossible. Shell alone operates thousands of kilometers of pipelines across the region, many of which are aging and poorly maintained. Reports show thousands of oil spills have occurred over the years, releasing massive quantities of crude oil into the environment. These spills go unaddressed or are inadequately cleaned up, allowing toxic substances to contaminate the environment for decades.

After Shell began extracting oil, the "oil cartels" of America began to wield considerable influence in Nigeria through press manipulation, bribery, and blackmail. The relationship between American and European oil corporations and the Nigerian military would become closer during the first Nigerian military government and the subsequent Biafran War. The Biafran War was a 2-year conflict centered in the Southeast of Nigeria. It was the direct consequence of a British colonial policy to increase resource competition amongst the various ethnic groups around which Nigeria was built, and the decentralized state this policy left behind. Specifically, the war began when Igbo nationalists declared the Republic of Biafra in response to the 1966 Nigerian coup d'état and the military regime's subsequent attempt at political centralization. During the war, the United States decided to "fence sit" as it courted both Nigeria and Biafra to ensure their oil production remained solvent. The British Government, Nigeria's former colonizers, threw their support to the Nigerian regime as the safest bet for maintaining and even expanding their oil supply. After Biafra was defeated, the Nigerian government forged stronger partnerships with the British and American oil industry.

== Early life and marriage to Kiobel ==
Esther Ita was born in 1964 in Port Harcourt. She moved to Lagos, and by 1990, writer and activist Ken Saro-Wiwa launched the Movement for the Survival of the Ogoni People (MOSOP). Esther returned home and married Barinem Kiobel, a man her aunt had taken in as a boy. Barinem Kiobel was a tourism expert studying for a PhD in the UK and moved frequently between the UK and Nigeria. Three years later, in 1993, the resistance gained the attention of 300,000 people from a population of 500,000 who took to the streets in January against Shell. On April 30, 1994, the military brutally attacked the Ogoni villages, and a month later, Ken Saro-Wiwa, Esther's husband, Dr. Barinem Kiobel, and 13 other men were arrested for their supposed involvement in the killing of four Ogoni chiefs who were known critics of the MOSOP. These arrests occurred in the wake of the Dutch Royal Shell Corporation ordering a crackdown on the MOSOP protesters.

Barinem Kiobel was the Commissioner of Commerce, Industry, and Tourism for Rivers State, and it remains unclear why he was targeted alongside Ken Saro-Wiwa, as he was not a member of MOSOP. From Amnesty International's article featuring Esther, "Esther says Barinem fell out of favor after refusing to work with the government against Ken. "My husband said, 'Sorry, number one, I'm a Christian. Number two, I'm a child of Ogoni. I cannot collaborate with you guys to harm Ken.' That's what he told them. And I believe from there he became an enemy to them."

== Kiobel's imprisonment, execution, and aftermath ==
Barinem Kiobel was imprisoned in the Bori Military Camp with the other members of the Ogoni Nine, where they were all held without due process. There was no initial indication that the government planned to execute Kiobel, and officials said he was imprisoned for his own protection. This upended Esther's life as she had lost her catering job because people viewed her husband as a criminal. Without income, she struggled to afford to support her four children. Yet, she devoted her time to bringing her husband food and clean water, as she became concerned he was being poisoned. This left Esther's 11-year-old daughter, Blessing, alone to maintain the house.

=== Paul Okuntimo and Esther's kidnapping ===
During one of Esther Kiobel's walks to the prison, an army officer named Paul Okuntimo saw her and offered to give her a ride. Okuntimo took Kiobel to his office instead of the prison, where he attempted to sexually assault Esther. She fought the assault, stating, "When I pushed him away, I guess he got upset, and slapped me. He has a big hand, and that was like fire coming out. I slapped him back." This led to Okuntimo to fight Esther Kiobel and call upon his subordinates in the army, who dragged her to a van, tied her up, and drove to an unknown location. They kept her captive for two weeks. While the officer imprisoned her, Esther's daughter, Blessing, had to take up the duties of bringing water to her stepfather. Esther was released after Barinem went on a hunger strike, and she continued bringing him supplies.

=== Barinem's execution ===
On October 30, Barinem Kiobel and the other members of the Ogoni 9 were sentenced to death and hanged on November 10. Esther received no notice of her husband's execution and only discovered it on one of her trips to bring him food. She was spending the day with Ken Saro-Wiwa's family and says she got a feeling she needed to see her husband. She drove down to the prison where she met with Saro-Wiwa's sister. While they were on their way to see the two men, a soldier said they had moved Kiobel, and he would take them to him. He brought them to the prison yard and made a hand gesture, which Saro-Wiwa's sister knew meant they had killed them. She then received Barinem Kiobel's only belongings from the prison: a bible and a comb. Before he was executed, Barinem Kiobel told the guards to "tell my wife I loved her."

=== Refugee in Benin and the U.S. ===
After her husband's execution, Kiobel said that "Life was terrible, horrible for us. It was very hard to put food on the table," as she had lost her husband, mother, and job in the span of a few months. Soon, she began to fear for her life as a friend reportedly told her that if she cared for the safety of her family and loved ones, she would leave Nigeria. Esther agreed, and she took her four children and her sister-in-law's three children to live in a refugee camp in Benin. Even then, Kiobel did not feel safe as she heard rumors about the Nigerian government kidnapping people from foreign countries. Esther moved herself and the children into a house in Benin, but still felt afraid. At this time, she came into contact with Amnesty International, the organization that would back her eventual legal campaigns. With Amnesty's help, Esther was granted asylum in the United States and came to America.

== Court cases ==
=== New York District Court ===
In September 2002, Kiobel filed a putative class action case against Royal Dutch Shell in the New York District Court. She was the named plaintiff and was the representative for herself and the other families of the Ogoni 9. This suit alleged Shell "aided and abetted, or were otherwise complicit in, violations of the law of nations by the Nigerian government." Esther's lawyers brought forward an Alien Tort Statute claim, the legal statute that gives federal courts jurisdiction over tort claims filed by foreign nationals for violations of international law. However, Kiobel's claims were dismissed following the Supreme Court's 2004 ruling in Sosa v. Alvarez-Machain, which limited the ATS by holding that the tort did not apply to arbitrary arrest and detention. The court also denied Shell's request to dismiss the allegations of aiding and abetting crimes against humanity. The court ultimately moved to send the case to the U.S Court of Appeals for the Second Circuit.

=== Second Circuit Court of Appeals ===
Esther and her lawyers would once again argue their case against Shell in front of the Second Circuit judges. This appeal, however, also raised more questions about the ATS rather than giving Kiobel any damages. In a 2-1 decision on September 17, 2010, the court ruled that corporations could not be held liable under "customary international law". The court makes it clear that this does not mean immunity for Shell or other corporations, but that international law places the focus on the individual who committed the crime against humanity, and that a corporation is not an individual. However, the decision left room for further argument for Kiobel and her attorneys. This led to Kiobel petitioning the U.S. Supreme Court for a review of the decision.

=== Supreme Court ===
The review was granted by the Supreme Court on October 17, 2011, and the case was heard by the court on February 28. The Shell Corporation attempted to sue Kiobel before the Supreme Court in Shell Petroleum Co. v. Kiobel. This potential case was dismissed by the Supreme Court without comment. Ultimately, the Supreme Court ruled against Kiobel, stating that U.S. courts had no jurisdiction in her case, ending her push for legal action against Shell in America. The Court did, however, suggest that the case would be better heard in a Dutch court, as that was the state from which Shell operated.

=== The Netherlands ===
In 2017, Kiobel took her case to The Hague along with Victoria Bera, Blessing Eawo, and Charity Levula. Kiobel, her co-plaintiffs, and their attorneys were once again arguing that the Shell corporation was complicit in the unlawful imprisonment, torture, and murder of their husbands. It took two years for The Hague to hear their case; oral arguments were brought forth in 2019. Kiobel's case relied on three men who told the court that they had been offered bribes to implicate the Ogoni Nine in criminal activities. In March 2022, The Hague dismissed Kiobel's case, citing insufficient evidence. Kiobel attempted to appeal the decision, but her lawyer eventually announced on November 8, 2022, that they were withdrawing the appeal.

The withdrawal from The Hague ended Kiobel's 20-year push for legal justice for her husband and the other Ogoni 9. However, even during her loss, Kiobel vowed to continue her campaign.

== Impact ==
Esther Kiobel's legal campaign against Shell brought the role of global corporations in human rights abuses. Additionally, Kiobel's three cases before the U.S courts raised important legal questions around corporate personhood, and many legal analysts state that Kiobel v. Royal Dutch Shell serves as a check on Citizens United. Kiobel has continued publicly telling her story through interviews with Amnesty International and a documentary titled Esther and the Law. In her four major court cases and campaigning in the media, Esther Kiobel brought more attention to the execution of Barinem Kiobel and the Ogoni Nine, as well as Shell's negative impact on the Niger Delta.

== See also ==
- Ken Saro-Wiwa
- Ogoni Nine
- Movement for the Survival of the Ogoni People
- Environmental issues in the Niger Delta
- Human rights in Nigeria
- Women in Nigeria
