= Sozaboy =

1985 novel by Ken Saro-Wiwa

Sozaboy: A Novel in Rotten English
- First Edition Cover
- Author: Ken Saro-Wiwa
- Language: English / Nigerian Pidgin English
- Genre: Anti-war novel
- Publisher: Saros International Publishers
- Publication date: 1985
- Publication place: Nigeria
- Media type: Print (paperback)
- ISBN: 9780582236998

Sozaboy: A Novel in Rotten English, more commonly known as Sozaboy (Soldier Boy), is a post-colonial and postmodern anti-war novel by the late author and political activist Ken Saro-Wiwa, published in 1985.

The novel was written in pidgin English, a variation of English native to some Nigerians and it has some unique characteristics such as doubling every adjective used in the novel. Some consider it a hard to read novel, however, Ken Saro-Wiwa provides a glossary for the terms that are unknown to the modern English reader, which increases readability and understandability of the novel.

The novel takes place during the Nigerian Civil War. The main character, Mene, has a naïve impression of soldiery. It will make him an adult, it will attract the attention of Agnes, and he will have a great uniform to impress everyone back in the village (Dukana), will sing songs while drilling, and will eat three meals a day without worry. However, once he joins, he slowly realizes differently; going for days without food is very difficult. Work hard, woman good. Sozaboy know how to party. Sozaboy want all the good stuff. Mene is just a boy, in a world of war. 'War is War'

One of the defining and most daring aspects of Sozaboy lies in its radical linguistic experiment. The author Ken Saro-Wiwa invents what he calls “Rotten English,” a hybrid language drawing on Nigerian Pidgin, broken English, standard English, and local idiomatic expressions — a deliberate departure from conventional “literary English.” This makes the novel at once a work of postcolonial aesthetic reclamation and an act of resistance: by refusing the colonial language as it was taught and sanitised, Saro-Wiwa reclaims the contours of his native expressive world, giving voice to a marginalized social milieu.

Moreover, by situating the story during the civil conflict commonly identified as the Nigerian Civil War (1967–1970), yet refusing to name sides, factions, or ethnic identities within the text, Sozaboy abstracts the horror and absurdity of war into a universal allegory of human suffering and disillusionment. The nameless, symbolic war-zone becomes a canvas onto which the reader projects, not only the Nigerian tragedy, but the timeless tragedy of any child-soldier, any disenfranchised youth, anywhere.

The novel’s arc—from naive idealism to brutal disillusionment—is not only a personal journey for the protagonist, Mene, but an indictment of militarism, exploitation, and the betrayal of youthful hopes in postcolonial societies. In doing so, Sozaboy emerges as a powerful African anti-war novel — not merely for its narrative, but for its bold linguistic choices, moral outrage, and capacity to give a voice to the voiceless.
