= Environmental issues in the Niger Delta =

Coordinates: 5°19′N 6°25′E

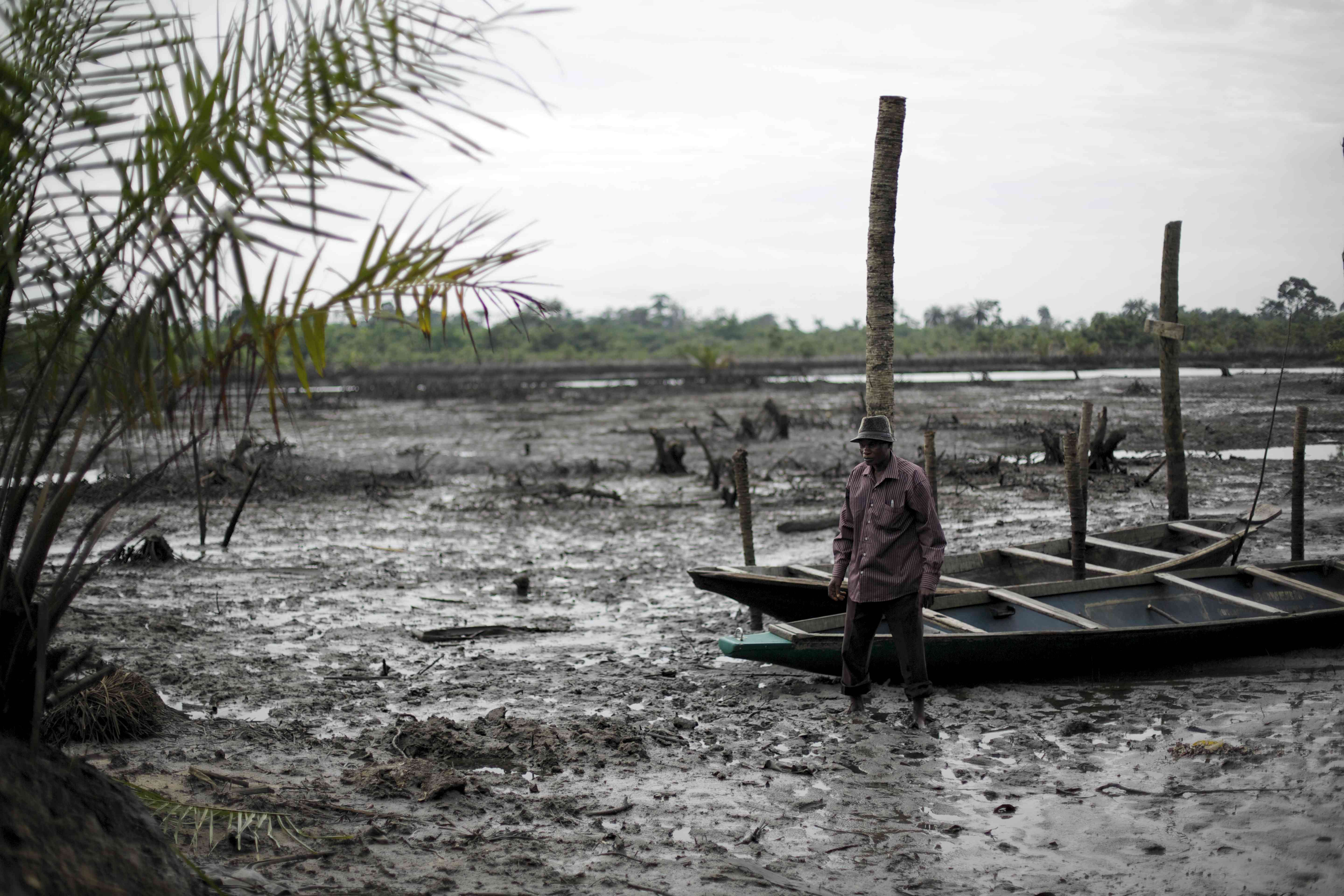
An oil spill in the fishing village of Kegbara-Dere, Rivers State on the Niger Delta. In 2016 Shell paid US$80 million for the spill

Petroleum extraction in the Niger Delta has led to many environmental issues. The delta covers 20,000 km^{2} (7,700 sq mi) within wetlands, formed primarily by sediment deposition. Home to 20 million people and 40 different ethnic groups, this floodplain makes up 7.5% of Nigeria's total land mass, and is Africa's largest wetland. The Delta's environment can be broken down into four ecological zones: coastal barrier islands, mangrove swamp forests, freshwater swamps, and lowland rainforests. Fishing and farming are the main sources of livelihoods for the majority of its residents.

The delta is well endowed with natural resources and the surrounding ecosystem contains one of the highest concentrations of biodiversity on the planet. In addition to supporting abundant flora and fauna, arable terrain that can sustain a wide variety of crops, lumber or agricultural trees, and more species of freshwater fish than any ecosystem in West Africa.

Unprecedented oil spillage, ongoing for the past five decades, has made the region one of the most polluted in the world. The heavy contamination of the air, ground and water with toxic pollutants is often used as an example of ecocide. It is estimated that while the European Union experienced 10 incidences of oil spills in 40 years, Nigeria recorded 9,343 cases within 10 years.

Environmental degradation from gas flaring, dredging of larger rivers, oil spillage and reclamation of land due to oil and gas extraction across the Niger Delta region costs about US$758 million every year. 75% of the cost is borne by the local communities through polluted water, infertile farmland and lost biodiversity. The region could experience a loss of 40% of its habitable terrain in the next thirty years as a result of extensive dam construction in the region.

== Oil spills ==
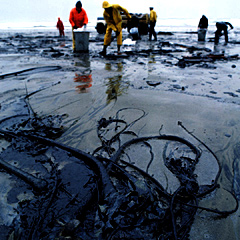
Oil spill

=== Extent of the problem ===
The Department of Petroleum Resources estimated that 1.89 million barrels of petroleum were spilled into the Niger Delta between 1976 and 1996 out of a total of 2.4 million barrels that spilled in 4,835 incidents (approximately 220 thousand cubic metres). A United Nations Development Programme (UNDP) report states that there have been a total of 6,817 oil spills between 1976 and 2001, which account for a loss of three million barrels of oil, of which more than 70% were not recovered. 69% of these spills occurred off-shore, a quarter was in swamps and 6% spilled on land. Bronwen Manby, then researcher in the Africa Division of Human Rights Watch, documented in July 1997 that "according to the official estimates of the Nigerian National Petroleum Corporation (NNPC)... approximately 2,300 cubic meters (610,000 U.S. gal) of oil are spilled in 300 separate incidents annually. It can be safely assumed that, due to under-reporting, the real figure is substantially higher: conservative estimates place it at up to ten times higher."

The Nigerian National Petroleum Corporation places the quantity of petroleum jettisoned into the environment yearly at 2,300 cubic metres (19,000 US bbl) with an average of 300 individual spills annually. However, because this amount does not take into account "minor" spills, the World Bank argues that the true quantity of petroleum spilled into the environment could be up to ten times greater. The largest individual spills include the blowout of a Texaco offshore station which in 1980 dumped an estimation amounting to sabotage 400,000 barrels (64,000 m^{3}) of crude oil into the Gulf of Guinea and Royal Dutch Shell's Forcados terminal tank failure which produced a spillage estimated at 580,000 barrels (92,000 m^{3}). In 2010 Baird reported that between nine million and 13 million barrels have been spilled in the Niger Delta since 1958. One source even calculates that the total amount of petroleum in barrels spilled between 1960 and 1997 is upwards of 100 million barrels (16,000,000 m^{3}). A United Nations report for 2011 documented that the environment of the Niger Delta was so polluted that it could take 25 to 30 years to reverse the associated sustainability consequences of the pollution.

A catastrophic spill occurred on May 1, 2010 at an ExxonMobil offshore oil platform approximately 35 to 45 kilometres (20 to 25 nautical miles) from shore. The rupture spewed more than 3.8 megalitres (1 million US gallons) of crude into the Delta. Because the spill occurred just 10 days after the Deepwater Horizon oil spill in the Gulf of Mexico, people affected by repeated spills in the Niger Delta noted "massive differences" in international response to these disasters and relative lack of media coverage for such events in Nigeria.

=== Causes ===
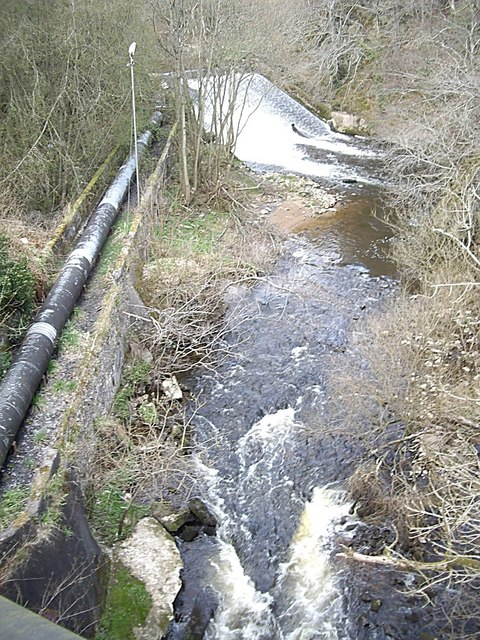
Oil pipeline

Most of the oil infrastructure is old and lacks regular inspection or maintenance. Half of all spills occur due to pipeline and tanker corrosion and accidents (50%), other causes include sabotage (28%) and oil production operations (21%), with 1% of the spills being accounted for by inadequate or non-functional production equipment.

A reason that corrosion accounts for such a high percentage of all spills is that as a result of the small size of the oilfields in the Niger Delta, there is an extensive network of pipelines between the fields, as well as numerous small networks of flowlines—the narrow diameter pipes that carry oil from wellheads to flowstations—allowing many opportunities for leaks. In onshore areas most pipelines and flowlines are laid above ground. Pipelines, which have an estimate life span of about fifteen years, are old and susceptible to corrosion. Many of the pipelines are as old as twenty to twenty-five years.

Shell admits that "most of the facilities were constructed between the 1960s and early 1980s to the then prevailing standards. SPDC [Shell Petroleum and Development Company] would not build them that way today.” Sabotage is performed primarily through what is known as "bunkering", whereby the saboteur attempts to tap the pipeline. In the process of extraction sometimes the pipeline is damaged or destroyed. Oil extracted in this manner can often be sold.

Sabotage and theft through oil siphoning has become a major issue in the Niger River Delta states as well, contributing to further environmental degradation. Damaged lines may go unnoticed for days, and repair of the damaged pipes takes even longer. Oil siphoning has become a big business, with the stolen oil quickly making its way onto the black market, referred to as "Nigerian Swag".

While the popularity of selling stolen oil increases, the number of deaths caused by explosion increase as well. In late December 2006 more than 200 people were killed in the Lagos region of Nigeria in an oil line explosion.

Nigerian regulations of the oil industry are weak and rarely enforced, allowing in essence, the industry to self-regulate.

=== Consequences ===
We witnessed the slow poisoning of the waters of this country and the destruction of vegetation and agricultural land and good water source by oil spills which occur during petroleum operations. But since the inception of the oil industry in Nigeria, more than fifty years ago, there has been no concerned and effective effort on the part of the government, let alone the oil operators, to control environmental problems associated with the industry.

— River Chiefs of the Niger Delta, 1992

Oil spillage has a major impact on the ecosystem into which it is released and may constitute ecocide. Immense tracts of the mangrove forests, which are especially susceptible to oil (mainly because it is stored in the soil and re-released annually during inundations), have been destroyed. An estimated 5 to 10% of Nigerian mangrove ecosystems have been wiped out either by settlement or oil. The rainforest which previously occupied some 7,400 km^{2} (2,900 sq mi) of land has disappeared as well. Spills in populated areas often spread out over a wide area, destroying crops and aquacultures through contamination of the groundwater and soils. The consumption of dissolved oxygen by bacteria feeding on the spilled hydrocarbons also contributes to the death of fish. In agricultural communities, often a year's supply of food can be destroyed instantaneously. The Niger River has been invaded by water hyacinth, which thrives in polluted environments but clogs waterways and competes with native plants.

People in the affected areas complain about health issues including breathing problems and skin lesions; many have lost basic human rights such as health, access to food, clean water, and an ability to work.

On 30 January 2013 a Dutch court ruled that Shell is liable for the pollution in the Niger Delta. In January 2015, Shell agreed to pay $80 million to the Ogoniland community of Bodo for two oil spills in 2008 after a court case in London.

=== Cleanup ===
In 2011, Nigeria commissioned a report from the United Nations on the impact of oil extraction in the delta area of 'Ogoniland'. The report found severe soil ground and tapwater contamination, destruction of mangroves, and "that institutional control measures in place both in the oil industry and the government were not implemented adequately." The UN concluded it would take over 30 years to reverse the damage. Based on those recommendations, in August 2017 Nigeria launched a $1 billion clean-up and restoration program. In January 2019 engineers first arrived to begin the clean-up.

In 2019, the Nigerian government came under scrutiny when a memo from President Muhammadu Buhari's office directed the Nigerian National Petroleum Corporation to take over the Ogoniland oil wells from Shell "and ensure smooth re-entry." NGOs and the Movement for the Survival of the Ogoni People have protested the proposed action.

The federal government of Nigeria through the Nigerian National Petroleum Corporation disbursed the sum of $180m as the take off fee for the 21 selected companies out of the 400 companies that bid for the contract.

== Loss of mangrove forests ==
Vegetation in the Niger River Delta consists of extensive mangrove forests, brackish swamp forests, and rainforests. The large expanses of mangrove forests are estimated to cover approximately 5,000 to 8,580 km^{2} (1,900 to 3,300 sq mi) of land. Mangroves remain very important to the indigenous people of Nigeria as well as to the various organisms that inhabit these ecosystems.

Human impact from poor land management upstream coupled with the constant pollution of petroleum has caused 5–10% of these mangrove forests to disappear. The volatile, quickly penetrating, and viscous properties of petroleum have wiped out large areas of vegetation. When spills occur close to and within the drainage basin, the hydrologic force of both the river and tides force spilled petroleum to move up into areas of vegetation.

Mangrove forests are included in a highly complex trophic system. If oil directly affects any organism within an ecosystem, it can indirectly affect a host of other organisms. These floral communities rely on nutrient cycling, clean water, sunlight, and proper substrates. With ideal conditions they offer habitat structure, and input of energy via photosynthesis to the organisms they interact with. The effects of petroleum spills on mangroves are known to acidify the soils, halt cellular respiration, and starve roots of vital oxygen.

An area of mangroves that has been destroyed by petroleum may be susceptible to other problems. These areas may not be suitable for any native plant growth until bacteria and microorganisms can remediate the conditions. A particular species of mangrove, Rhizophora racemosa, lives higher in the delta system. As the soils supporting R. racemosa become too toxic, a non-native invasive species of palm, Nypa fruticans, quickly colonises the area. This invasive species has a shallower root system that destabilises the banks along the waterways, further affecting sediment distribution lower in the delta system. N. fruticans also impedes navigation and decreases overall biodiversity. In places where N. fruticans has invaded, communities are investigating how the palm can be used by local people.

The loss of mangrove forests is not only degrading life for plants and animals, but for humans as well. These systems are highly valued by the indigenous people living in the affected areas. Mangrove forests have been a major source of wood for local people. They also are important to a variety of species vital to subsistence practices for local indigenous groups, who unfortunately see little to none of the economic benefits of petroleum. Mangroves also provide essential habitat for rare and endangered species like the manatee and pygmy hippopotamus. Poor policy decisions regarding the allocation of petroleum revenue has caused political unrest in Nigeria. This clash among governing bodies, oil corporations, and the people of Nigeria has resulted in sabotage of petroleum pipelines, further exacerbating the threat to mangrove forests.

The future for mangrove forests and other floral communities is not all negative. Local and outside groups have provided funds and labour to remediate and restore the destroyed mangrove swamps. The federal government of Nigeria established the Niger Delta Development Commission (NDDC) in 2000 which aims to suppress the environmental and ecological impacts petroleum has had in the region. Governmental and nongovernmental organisations have also utilised technology to identify the source and movement of petroleum spills.

== Depletion of fish population ==
The fishing industry is an essential part of Nigeria's sustainability because it provides much needed protein and nutrients for people, but with the higher demand on fishing, fish populations are declining as they are being depleted faster than they are able to restore their number. Fishing needs to be limited along the Niger River and aquacultures should be created to provide for the growing demand on the fishing industry. Aquaculture allows for fish to be farmed for production and provide more jobs for the local people of Nigeria.

Overfishing is not the only impact on marine communities. Climate change, habitat loss, and pollution are all added pressures to these important ecosystems. The banks of the Niger River are desirable and ideal locations for people to settle. The river provides water for drinking, bathing, cleaning, and fishing for both the dinner table and trading to make a profit. As the people have settled along the shores of the rivers and coasts, marine and terrestrial habitats are being lost and ecosystems are being drastically changed. The shoreline along the Niger River is important in maintaining the temperature of the water because the slightest change in water temperature can be fatal to certain marine species. Trees and shrubs provide shade and habitat for marine species, while reducing fluctuation in water temperature.

The Niger River is an important ecosystem that needs to be protected, for it is home to 36 families and nearly 250 species of fish, of which 20 are endemic, meaning they are found nowhere else on Earth. With the loss of habitat and the climate getting warmer, every prevention of temperature increase is necessary to maintain some of the marine environments. Other than restoring habitat, pollution can also be reduced. Problems such as pesticides from agricultural fields could be reduced if a natural pesticide was used, or the fields were moved farther away from the local waterways. Oil pollution can be lowered as well; if spills were reduced then habitat and environmental impacts could be minimised. Oil Contamination affects the fish population and affects the farmers that rely on fishing to support their family. By enforcing laws and holding oil companies accountable for their actions the risk of contamination can be greatly reduced. By limiting the devastation caused by disturbances to the marine environment, such as pollution, overfishing, and habitat loss, the productivity and biodiversity of the marine ecosystems would increase.

== Natural gas flaring ==
Nigeria flares more natural gas associated with oil extraction than any other country, with estimates suggesting that of the 3.5 billion cubic feet (100,000,000 m^{3}) of associated gas (AG) produced annually, 2.5 billion cubic feet (70,000,000 m^{3}), or about 70%, is wasted by flaring. This equals about 25% of the UK's total natural gas consumption and is the equivalent to 40% of Africa's gas consumption in 2001. Statistical data associated with gas flaring are notoriously unreliable, but Nigeria may waste US$2 billion per year by flaring associated gas.

Flaring is done as it is costly to separate commercially viable associated gas from the oil. Companies operating in Nigeria also harvest natural gas for commercial purposes but prefer to extract it from deposits where it is found in isolation as non-associated gas. Thus associated gas is burned off to decrease costs.

Gas flaring is generally discouraged as it releases toxic components into the atmosphere and contributes to climate change. In western Europe 99% of associated gas is used or re-injected into the ground. Gas flaring in Nigeria began simultaneously with oil extraction in the 1960s by Shell-BP. Alternatives to flaring are gas re-injection or to store it for use as an energy source. If properly stored, the gas could be used for community projects.

Gas flaring releases of large amounts of methane, which has a high global warming potential. The methane is accompanied by the other major greenhouse gas, carbon dioxide, of which Nigeria was estimated to have emitted more than 34.38 million metric tons of in 2002, accounting for about 50% of all industrial emissions in the country and 30% of the total CO_{2} emissions. While flaring in the west has been minimised, in Nigeria it has grown proportionally with oil production.

The international community, the Nigerian government, and the oil corporations seem in agreement that gas flaring needs to be curtailed. Efforts to do so, however, have been limited although flaring has been declared illegal since 1984 under section 3 of the "Associated Gas Reinjection Act" of Nigeria.

While OPEC and Shell, the biggest flarer of natural gas in Nigeria, alike claim that only 50% of all associated gas is burnt off via flaring, these data are contested. The World Bank reported in 2004 that, "Nigeria currently flares 75% of the gas it produces."

Gas flares have potentially harmful effects on the health and livelihood of nearby communities, as they release poisonous chemicals including nitrogen dioxides, sulphur dioxide, volatile organic compounds like benzene, toluene, xylene and hydrogen sulfide, as well as carcinogens like benzapyrene and dioxins. Humans exposed to such substances can suffer from respiratory problems. These chemicals can aggravate asthma, cause breathing difficulties and pain, as well as chronic bronchitis. Benzene, known to be emitted from gas flares in undocumented quantities, is well recognised as a cause for leukaemia and other blood-related diseases. A study done by Climate Justice estimates that exposure to benzene would result in eight new cases of cancer yearly in Bayelsa State alone.

Gas flares are often close to communities and regularly lack fencing or protection for villagers who risk working near their heat. Many communities claim that nearby flares cause acid rain which corrodes their homes and other structures, many of which have zinc-based roofing. Some people resort to using asbestos-based material, which is stronger in repelling acid rain deterioration. Unfortunately, this contributes to their declining health and the health of their environment. Asbestos exposure increases the risk of forming lung cancer, pleural and peritoneal mesothelioma, and asbestosis.

Whether or not flares contribute to acid rain is debatable, as some independent studies conducted have found that the sulphur dioxide and nitrous oxide content of most flares was insufficient to establish a link between flaring and acid rain. Other studies from the U.S. Energy Information Administration (EIA) report that gas flaring is "a major contributor to air pollution and acid rain."

Older flares are rarely relocated away from villages and are known to coat the land and communities with soot and to damage adjacent vegetation. Almost no vegetation can grow in the area directly surrounding the flares due to their heat.

In November 2005 a judgement by the Federal High Court of Nigeria ordered that gas flaring must stop in a Niger Delta community as it violates guaranteed constitutional rights to life and dignity. In a case brought against the Shell Petroleum Development Company of Nigeria (Shell), Justice C. V. Nwokorie ruled in Benin City that "the damaging and wasteful practice of flaring cannot lawfully continue." As of May 2011, Shell had not ceased gas flaring in Nigeria.

== Biological remediation ==
The use of biological remediation has also been implemented in areas of the delta to detoxify and restore ecosystems damaged by oil spills. Bioremediation involves biological components in the remediation or clean-up of a specific site. A study conducted in Ogbogu located in one of the largest oil producing regions of Nigeria has utilised two plant species to clean up spills. The first stage of clean-up involves Hibiscus cannabinus, a plant species indigenous to West Africa. H. cannabinus is an annual herbaceous plant originally used for pulp production. This species has high rates of absorbency and can be laid down on top of the water to absorb oil. The oil saturated plant material is then removed and sent to a safe location where the hydrocarbons can be broken down and detoxified by microorganisms. The second stage of bioremediation involves a plant known as Vetiveria zizanioides, a perennial grass species. V. zizanioides has a deep fibrous root network that can both tolerate chemicals in the soil and can also detoxify soils through time requiring little maintenance. The people of Ogbogu hope to use these methods of bioremediation to improve the quality of drinking water, soil conditions, and the health of their surrounding environment.

== Movement for protection of the Niger Delta ==
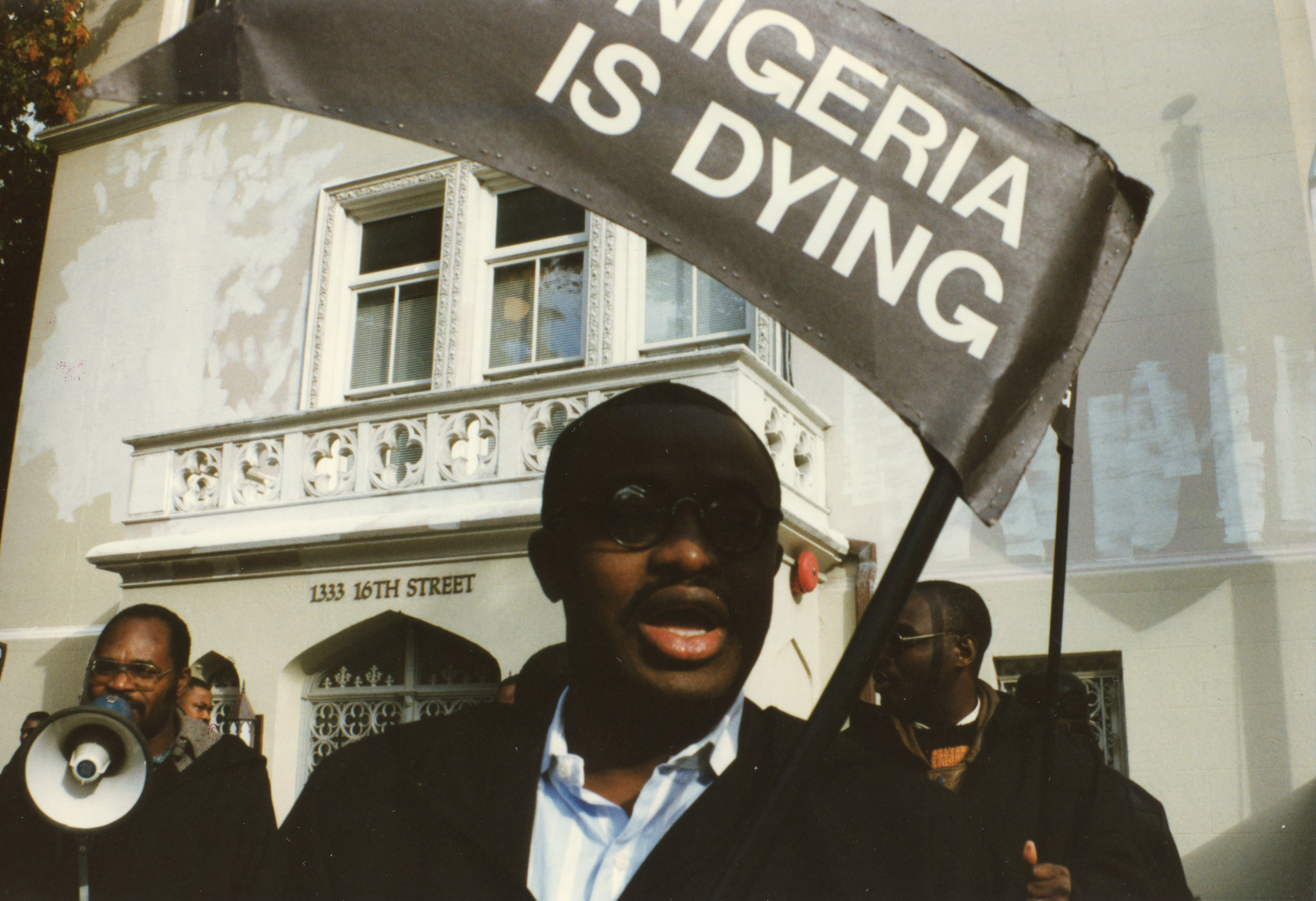
Protestors outside the Embassy of Nigeria, Washington, D.C., 1995

Conflict in the Niger Delta rose sharply in the early 1990s resulting from deteriorating environmental conditions for local inhabitants stemming from major oil spills and other petroleum extraction activities of foreign Big oil companies and their contractors. Many of the Niger Delta's inhabitants, including minority ethnic groups, particularly the Ogoni and the Ijaw people, feel they are being exploited and their ability to earn a living on their land is being undermined. Ethnic and political unrest continued throughout the 1990s despite the return to democracy and the election of the Obasanjo government in 1999.

The Movement for the Survival of the Ogoni People (MOSOP) is a grass-roots social movement organisation of the indigenous Ogoni people of Central Niger Delta. MOSOP is an umbrella organisation of eleven member groups that together represent over 700,000 indigenous Ogoni in a non-violent campaign for social, economic and environmental justice in the Niger Delta. MOSOP was founded in 1990 by the award-winning environmental activist Ken Saro-Wiwa, who was later executed by the government. In response, his family sued Shell, alleging that it was complicit in the execution, alongside other human rights abuses. The case was settled in 2009.

== Flooding ==
Several communities and states within the Niger Delta region of Nigeria has experienced flooding which has affected economic activities. In 2022, Rivers, Anambra, Delta, Cross River and Bayelsa states experienced different degrees of flooding which led to loss of lives and properties. It was reported that in 2022 alone, about 603 lives were lost to flooding while over one million persons were displaced as a result of the flood.

== See also ==
- Conflict in the Niger Delta – Ongoing military conflict
- Deforestation in Nigeria – Causes and effects of forest loss in Nigeria
- Nigeria gully erosion crisis – Environmental disaster
- Nigerian Gas Association – Industry professional body in Nigeria
- Petroleum in Nigeria – Oil production in Nigeria
- Niger Delta swamp forests – Ecoregion in Nigeria
