= Ken Saro-Wiwa =

Nigerian social rights activist (1941–1995)

Ken Saro-Wiwa CON
- Born: Kenule Beeson Saro-Wiwa; 10 October 1941; Bori, British Nigeria
- Died: 10 November 1995 (aged 54); Port Harcourt, Rivers State, Nigeria
- Cause of death: Execution by hanging
- Education: University of Ibadan
- Occupations: Writer; television producer; social rights activist
- Movement: Movement for the Survival of the Ogoni People
- Children: 5, including Ken Wiwa, Zina and Noo
- Parents: Jim Wiwa (father); Widu Wiwa (mother)
- Relatives: Owens Wiwa (brother)
- Awards: Right Livelihood Award; Goldman Environmental Prize

Kenule Beeson Saro-Wiwa CON (10 October 1941 – 10 November 1995) was a Nigerian writer, teacher, television producer, and social rights activist. He was a member of the Ogoni people, an ethnic minority in the Niger Delta whose homeland, Ogoniland, has been targeted for crude oil extraction since the 1950s and has suffered extreme environmental damage from decades of indiscriminate petroleum waste dumping.

Initially as a spokesperson, and then as the president, of the Movement for the Survival of the Ogoni People (MOSOP), Saro-Wiwa led a nonviolent campaign against environmental degradation of the land and waters of Ogoniland by multiple international oil companies, especially the Royal Dutch Shell company. He criticized the Nigerian government for its reluctance to enforce environmental regulations on the foreign petroleum companies operating in the area.

At the peak of his non-violent campaign, he was tried by a special military tribunal for allegedly masterminding the murder of Ogoni chiefs at a pro-government meeting, and was hanged in 1995 by the military dictatorship of General Sani Abacha. His execution triggered international outrage and led to Nigeria's suspension from the Commonwealth of Nations for more than three years.

== Biography ==
=== Early life ===
Kenule Saro-Wiwa was born in Bori, near Port Harcourt, Nigeria, on 10 October 1941. He was the son of Chief Jim Wiwa, a forest ranger who held a title in the Nigerian chieftaincy system, and his third wife Widu. He officially changed his name to Saro-Wiwa after the Nigerian Civil War. He was married to Maria Saro-Wiwa. His father's hometown was the village of Bane, Ogoniland, whose residents speak the Khana dialect of the Ogoni language. He spent his childhood in an Anglican home and eventually proved himself to be an excellent student. He received primary education at a Native Authority school in Bori, then attended secondary school at Government College Umuahia. A distinguished student, he was captain of the table tennis team and amassed school prizes in History and English.

On the completion of his secondary education, he obtained a scholarship to study English at the University of Ibadan. At Ibadan, he plunged into academic and cultural interests, winning departmental prizes in 1963 and 1965. He was also affiliated with a travelling drama troupe that performed in Kano, Benin, Ilorin and Lagos and collaborated with the Nottingham Playhouse theater group.

He briefly became a teaching assistant at the University of Lagos and later served as an African literature lecturer at University of Nigeria, Nsukka until the civil war broke out; he supported the Federal Government and so had to leave the region and return to Bori. On his journey to Port-Harcourt, he witnessed the multitudes of refugees returning to the East, a scene he described as a "sorry sight to see." Three days after his arrival in Bonny, it fell to federal troops. His family then stayed in Bonny while he travelled back to Lagos and took a position at the University of Lagos, although this did not last long as he was called back to Bonny to serve as the port city's Civilian Administrator.

During the Nigerian Civil War he positioned himself as an Ogoni leader dedicated to the Federal cause. He followed his job as an administrator with an appointment as a commissioner in the old Rivers State. His best known novel, Sozaboy: A Novel in Rotten English (1985), tells the story of a naive village boy recruited to the army during the Nigerian Civil War of 1967 to 1970, and intimates the political corruption and patronage in Nigeria's military regime at the time. His war diaries, On a Darkling Plain (1989), document his experiences during the war.

In the early 1970s, he served as the Regional Commissioner for Education in the Rivers State Cabinet, but was dismissed in 1973 because of his support for Ogoni autonomy.

He was also a successful businessman and television producer. His satirical television series, Basi & Company, was wildly popular, with an estimated audience of 30 million. In the late 1970s, he established a number of successful business ventures in retail and real estate, and during the 1980s concentrated primarily on his writing, journalism and television production.

He became involved in the political arena in 1977, running as the candidate to represent Ogoni in the Constituent Assembly; he lost the election by a narrow margin. It was during this time he had a falling out with his friend Edwards Kobani.

His intellectual work was interrupted in 1987 when he re-entered the political scene, having been appointed by the newly installed dictator Ibrahim Babangida to aid the country's transition to democracy. However, he resigned because he felt Babangida's supposed plans for a return to democracy were disingenuous. His sentiments were proven correct in the coming years, as Babangida failed to relinquish power: In 1993, Babangida annulled Nigeria's general elections that would have transferred power to a civilian government, sparking mass civil unrest and eventually forcing him to step down, at least officially, that same year.

=== Works ===
Saro-Wiwa's works include television, drama and prose writing. His earlier works from the 1970s to the 1980s were mostly satirical displays that portray a counter-image of Nigerian society. His later writings were more inspired by political dimensions such as environmental and social justice than satire.

Transistor Radio, one of his best-known plays, was written for a revue during his university days at Ibadan but still resonated well with Nigerian society. A radio adaptation of the play was produced in 1972 and, in 1985, he produced Basi and Company, a television adadption which ran until 1990. He included the play in Four Farcical Plays and Basi and Company: Four Television Plays. A farcical comedy, the show chronicles city life and is anchored by the protagonist, Basi, a resourceful and street-wise character looking for ways to achieve his goal of obtaining millions, which always ends up as an elusive mission.

In 1985, the Biafran Civil War novel Sozaboy was published. The protagonist's language was written in non-standard English or what Saro-Wiwa called "Rotten English", a hybrid language of pidgin English, standard English and broken English.

=== Activism ===
In 1990, he began devoting most of his time to human rights and environmental causes, particularly in the land settled by the Ogoni people. He was one of the earliest members of the Movement for the Survival of the Ogoni People (MOSOP), which advocated for the rights of the Ogoni people. The MOSOP crafted the Ogoni Bill of Rights which set out the movement's demands, including increased autonomy for the Ogoni people, a fair share of the proceeds of oil extraction, and remediation of environmental damage to Ogoni lands. In particular, MOSOP struggled against the degradation of Ogoni lands by Royal Dutch Shell.

In 1992, he was imprisoned for several months by the Nigerian military government without trial.

He was Vice Chairman of the Unrepresented Nations and Peoples Organization (UNPO) General Assembly from 1993 to 1995. UNPO is an international, non-violent, and democratic organisation (of which MOSOP is a member). Its members are indigenous peoples, minorities, and under-recognised or occupied territories who have joined together to protect and promote their human and cultural rights, to preserve their environments and to find non-violent solutions to conflicts which affect them.

In January 1993, MOSOP organised peaceful marches of around 300,000 Ogoni people– more than half of the Ogoni population – through four Ogoni urban centres, drawing international attention to their people's plight. The same year the Nigerian government occupied the region militarily.

=== Arrest and execution ===
He was arrested again and detained by Nigerian authorities in June 1993 but was released after a month. On 21 May 1994, four Ogoni chiefs (all on the conservative side of a schism within MOSOP over strategy) were brutally murdered. Saro-Wiwa had been denied entry to Ogoniland on the day of the murders, but he was arrested and accused of inciting them. He denied the charges but was imprisoned for more than a year before being found guilty and sentenced to death by a specially convened tribunal. The same happened to eight other MOSOP leaders who, along with Saro-Wiwa, became known as the Ogoni Nine.

Some of the defendants' lawyers resigned in protest against the alleged rigging of the trial by the Abacha regime. The resignations left the defendants to their own means against the tribunal, which continued to bring witnesses to testify against Saro-Wiwa and his peers. Many of these supposed witnesses later admitted that they had been bribed by the Nigerian government to support the criminal allegations. At least two witnesses who testified that Saro-Wiwa was involved in the murders of the Ogoni elders later recanted, stating that they had been bribed with money and offers of jobs with Shell to give false testimony, in the presence of Shell's lawyer.

The trial was widely criticised by human rights organisations, and six months later, Saro-Wiwa received the Right Livelihood Award for his courage, as well as the Goldman Environmental Prize.

On 8 November 1995, a military ruling council upheld the death sentences. The military government then immediately moved to carry them out. The prison in Port Harcourt was selected as the place of execution. Although the government wanted to carry out the sentences immediately, it had to wait two days for a gallows to be built. Within hours of the sentences being upheld, nine coffins were taken to the prison, and the following day a team of executioners was flown in from Sokoto to Port Harcourt.

On 10 November 1995, Saro-Wiwa and the rest of the Ogoni Nine were taken from the army base where they were being held to Port Harcourt prison. They were told that they were being moved to Port Harcourt because it was feared that the army base might be attacked by Ogoni youths. The prison was heavily guarded by riot police and tanks, and hundreds of people lined the streets in anticipation of the executions. After arriving at Port Harcourt prison, Saro-Wiwa and the others were herded into a single room and their wrists and ankles were shackled. They were then led one by one to the gallows and executed by hanging, with Saro-Wiwa being the first. It took five tries to execute him due to faulty equipment. His last words were: "Lord take my soul, but the struggle continues." After the executions, the bodies were taken to the Port Harcourt Cemetery under armed guard and buried. Anticipating disturbances as a result of the executions, the Nigerian government deployed tens of thousands of troops and riot police to two southern provinces and major oil refineries around the country. The Port Harcourt Cemetery was surrounded by soldiers and tanks.

The executions provoked a storm of international outrage. South Africa took a primary role in leading international criticism, with President Nelson Mandela urging Nigeria's suspension from the Commonwealth of Nations. Zimbabwe and Kenya also backed Mandela, with Kenyan President Daniel arap Moi and Zimbabwean President Robert Mugabe backing Mandela's demand to suspend Nigeria's Commonwealth membership, although a number of other African leaders criticized the suggestion. Nigeria's membership in the Commonwealth of Nations was ultimately suspended, and Nigeria was threatened with expulsion if it did not transition to democracy in two years.

The United Nations General Assembly condemned the executions in a resolution which passed by a vote of 101 in favor to 14 against and 47 abstentions. The European Union condemned the executions, which it called a "cruel and callous act", and imposed an arms embargo on Nigeria. The United States recalled its ambassador from Nigeria, imposed an arms embargo on Nigeria, and imposed travel restrictions on members of the Nigerian military regime and their families. The United Kingdom recalled its high commissioner in Nigeria, and British Prime Minister John Major called the executions "judicial murder." The US and British governments also discussed the possibility of an oil embargo backed by a naval blockade of Nigeria.

=== Ken Saro-Wiwa Foundation ===
The Ken Saro-Wiwa Foundation was established in 2017 to work towards improved access to basic resources such as electricity and Internet for entrepreneurs in Port Harcourt. The association founded the Ken Junior Award, named for Saro-Wiwa's son Ken Wiwa, who died in October 2016. The award is presented to innovative start-up technology companies in Port Harcourt.

== Family lawsuits against Royal Dutch Shell ==
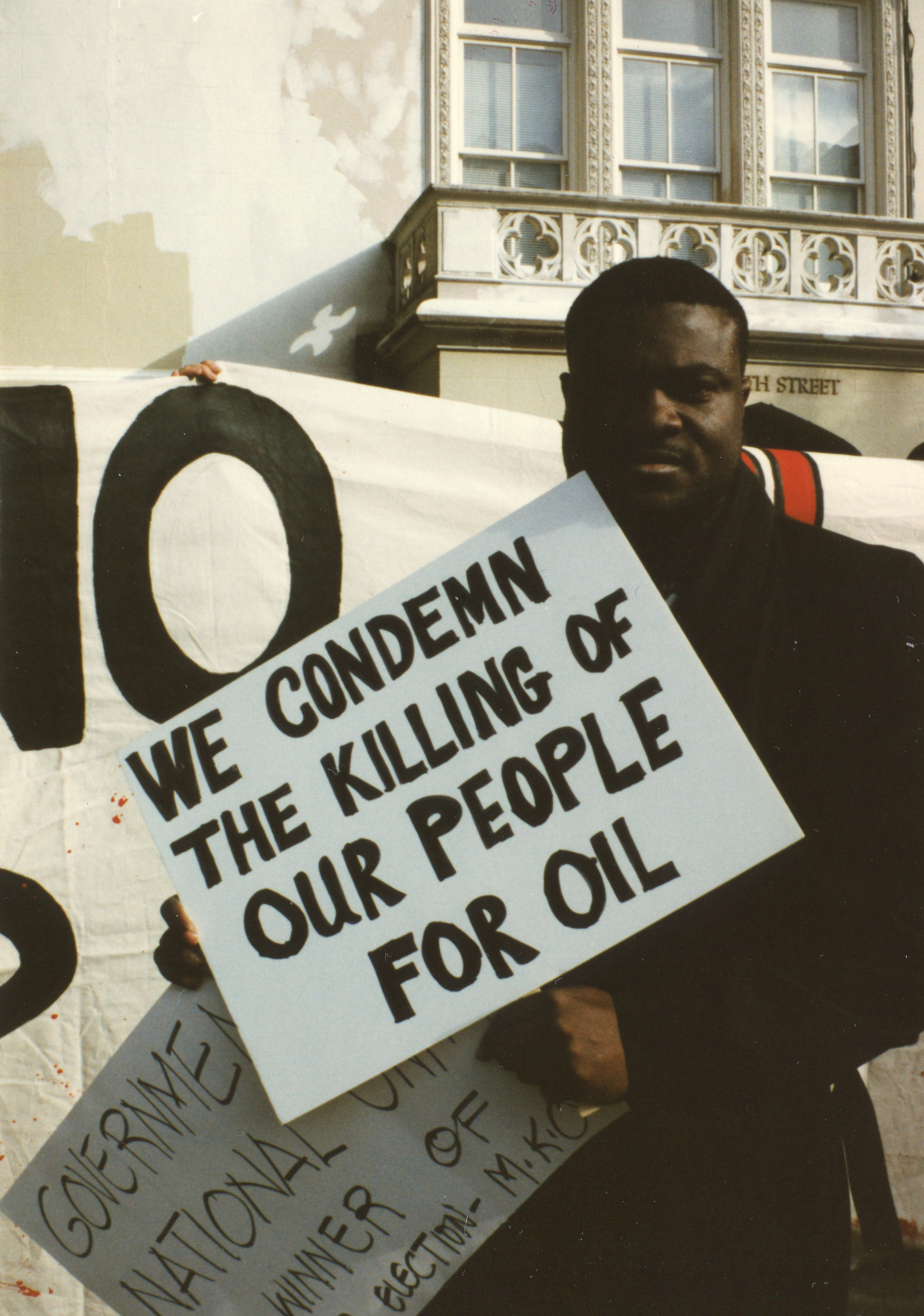
Protest in Washington, D.C. against the killing of Saro-Wiwa and others, November 1995

Beginning in 1996, the Center for Constitutional Rights (CCR), Earth Rights International (ERI), Paul Hoffman of Schonbrun, DeSimone, Seplow, Harris & Hoffman and other human rights attorneys brought a series of cases to hold Shell accountable for alleged human rights violations in Nigeria, including summary execution, crimes against humanity, torture, inhumane treatment and arbitrary arrest and detention. The lawsuits are brought against Royal Dutch Shell and Brian Anderson, the head of its Nigerian operation.

The cases were brought under the Alien Tort Statute, a 1789 statute giving non-US citizens the right to file suits in US courts for international human rights violations, and the Torture Victim Protection Act, which allows individuals to seek damages in the US for torture or extrajudicial killing, regardless of where the violations take place.

The United States District Court for the Southern District of New York set a trial date in June 2009. On 9 June 2009, just days before the trial was scheduled to commence, Shell agreed to an out-of-court settlement of US $15.5 million to victims' families. However, the company denied any liability for the deaths, stating that the payment was part of a reconciliation process. In a statement given after the settlement, Shell suggested that the money was being provided to the relatives of Saro-Wiwa and the eight other victims to cover the legal costs of the case and also in recognition of the events that took place in the region. Some of the funding is also expected to be used to set up a development trust for the Ogoni people, who inhabit the Niger Delta region of Nigeria.

== Legacy ==
The execution of Saro-Wiwa marked the beginning of the international business and human rights (BHR) movement.

Saro-Wiwa and other members of the Ogoni Nine were granted a posthumous pardon by President Bola Tinubu on 12 June 2025.

=== In popular culture ===
==== Artwork and memorials ====
- A memorial to Saro-Wiwa was unveiled in London on 10 November 2006 by London organisation Platform. It consists of a sculpture in the form of a bus and was created by Nigerian-born artist Sokari Douglas Camp. It toured the UK the following year.

==== Awards ====
- The Association of Nigerian Authors is a sponsor of the Ken Saro-Wiwa Prize for Prose.
- Saro-Wiwa was named a Writer hero by The My Hero Project.
- The American news publication Foreign Policy has listed Ken Saro-Wiwa alongside Mahatma Gandhi, Eleanor Roosevelt, Corazon Aquino and Václav Havel as people "who never won the Nobel Peace Prize, but should have".

==== Literature ====
- Richard North Patterson's novel Eclipse (2009) was loosely based on Saro-Wiwa's life.

==== Music ====
- The fourth track on the 1996 album Vapaaherran elämää by Finnish band Ultra Bra is about Saro-Wiwa, entitled "Ken Saro-Wiwa on kuollut" ('Ken Saro-Wiwa is dead').
- The title track of Italian noise rock band Il Teatro degli Orrori's 2009 album A Sangue Freddo ("In Cold Blood") is about Saro-Wiwa's struggle, and includes quotes from his works.
- A folk duo Magpie included a song called "Saro-Wiwa" on their album Give Light, using lines from Saro-Wiwa’s poem "Dance".
- The Canadian band King Cobb Steelie was inspired by Saro-Wiwa’s execution in their song "Rational".
- The Nigerian singer Nneka refers to him in her song "Soul Is Heavy" (and its music video).
- The punk band Anti-Flag references him in their song "Mumia's Song".
- Nigerian singer Ayra Starr mentioned Ken Saro-Wiwa in her song "Who's Dat Girl", featuring Nigerian rapper and singer Rema; she mentioned him in the last verse of the song: "I dey motivate like Ken Saro-Wiwa (Ou)."
- American rapper R.A.P. Ferreira references Saro-Wiwa in the last verse of "zen scientist" on his 2015 album with Kenny Segal, So the Flies Don't Come (released under milo).
- In 2009 Italian Rock band Il Teatro degli Orrori released a song about Saro-Wiwa's executiontitled A Sangue Freddo (lit. "In Cold Blood").

=== Naming ===
- The Governor of Rivers State, Ezenwo Nyesom Wike, renamed the Rivers State Polytechnic after Saro-Wiwa.
- Amsterdam named a street after Saro-Wiwa, the Ken Saro-Wiwastraat.
- An ant, Zasphinctus sarowiwai, was named after Saro-Wiwa in 2017.

== Documentaries ==
A BBC World Service radio documentary, Silence Would Be Treason, was broadcast in January 2022, presented by his daughter Noo Saro-Wiwa and voiced by Ben Arogundade.

== Personal life ==
Saro-Wiwa and his wife Maria had five children, who grew up with their mother in the United Kingdom while their father remained in Nigeria. They include Ken Wiwa and Noo Saro-Wiwa, both journalists and writers, and Noo's twin Zina Saro-Wiwa, a journalist and filmmaker. In addition, Saro-Wiwa had two daughters (Singto and Adele) with another woman. He also had another son, Kwame Saro-Wiwa, who was only one year old when his father was executed.

== Biographies ==
- Canadian author J. Timothy Hunt's The Politics of Bones (September 2005), published shortly before the 10th anniversary of Saro-Wiwa's execution, documented the flight of Saro-Wiwa's brother Owens Wiwa after his brother's execution and his own imminent arrest. Owens fled to London and then on to Canada, where he is now a citizen and continues his brother's fight on behalf of the Ogoni people. It is also the story of Owens' personal battle against the Nigerian government to locate his brother's remains after they were buried in an unmarked mass-grave.
- Ogoni's Agonies: Ken Saro Wiwa and the Crisis in Nigeria (1998), edited by Abdul Rasheed Naʾallah, provides more information on the struggles of the Ogoni people.
- Onookome Okome's book, Before I Am Hanged: Ken Saro-Wiwa—Literature, Politics, and Dissent (1999) is a collection of essays about Wiwa.
- In the Shadow of a Saint: A Son's Journey to Understanding His Father's Legacy (2000), was written by his son Ken Wiwa.
- Saro-Wiwa's own diary, A Month and a Day: A Detention Diary, was published in January 1995, two months after his execution.
- In Looking for Transwonderland - Travels in Nigeria, his daughter Noo Saro-Wiwa tells the story of her return to Nigeria years after her father's murder.

== Bibliography ==
- —— (1973). Tambari. Ikeja: Longman Nigeria. ISBN 978-0-582-60135-2.
- —— (1979). Tambari in Dukana. Lagos, Nigeria: Longman. ISBN 978-0-582-60137-6.
- —— (1983). A Bride for Mr. B. Port Harcourt, Nigeria: Saros International. ISBN 978-1-870716-26-0.
- —— (1985). Songs in a Time of War. Port Harcourt: Saros. ISBN 9789782460004.
- —— (1986). Sozaboy: A Novel in Rotten English. Port Harcourt: Saros. ISBN 978-2460-02-8.
- —— (1986). A Forest of Flowers. Port Harcourt: Saros International. ISBN 9780582273207.
- —— (1987). Mr. B. Port Harcourt, Nigeria: Saros. ISBN 978-1-870716-01-7.
- —— (1987). Basi and Company: A Modern African Folktale. Port Harcourt, Nigeria: Saros. ISBN 978-1-870716-00-0.
- —— (1987). Basi and Company: Four Television Plays. Port Harcourt, Nigeria: Saros. ISBN 978-1-870716-03-1.
- —— (1988). Prisoners of Jebs. Port Harcourt [u.a.]: Saros. ISBN 978-1-870716-02-4.
- —— (1989). Mr. B Goes to Lagos. Port Harcourt, Nigeria: Saros International. ISBN 9789782460059.
- —— (1989). Adaku & Other Stories. London: Saros International. ISBN 1-870716-10-8.
- —— (1989). Four Farcical Plays. London: Saros International. ISBN 1-870716-09-4.
- —— (1989). On a Darkling Plain: An Account of the Nigerian Civil War. Epsom: Saros. ISBN 1-870716-11-6.
- —— (1989). The Transistor Radio. Port Harcourt, Nigeria: Saros International. ISBN 978-1-870716-06-2.
- —— (1991). Nigeria: The Brink of Disaster. Port Harcourt, Nigeria: Saros International. ISBN 9781870716161.
- —— (1991). Similia: Essays on Anomic Nigeria. London: Saros International. ISBN 978-2460-20-6.
- —— (1991). Pita Dumbrok's Prison. Port Harcourt, Nigeria: Saros International. ISBN 978-2460-19-2.
- —— (1991). Mr. B Is Dead. London, Lagos, Port Harcourt: Saros International Publishers. ISBN 1-870716-14-0.
- —— (1991). Segi Finds the Radio. Port Harcourt, Nigeria: Saros International. ISBN 978-1-870716-12-3.
- —— (1991). A shipload of Rice. London: Saros International. ISBN 978-1-870716-13-0.
- —— (1992). Mr. B's Mattress. London: Saros International. ISBN 978-2460-24-9.
- —— (1992). Genocide in Nigeria: The Ogoni Tragedy. London: Saros. ISBN 1-870716-22-1.
- —— (1995). A Forest of Flowers: Short Stories. Burnt Mill, Harlow, Essex, England: Longman. ISBN 978-0-582-27320-7.
- —— (1995). A Month and a Day: A Detention Diary. New York, N.Y.: Penguin Books. ISBN 978-0-14-025914-8.
- —— (1996). The Singing Anthill: Ogoni Folktales. Port Harcourt, Nigeria: Saros International. ISBN 978-1-870716-15-4.
- —— (1996). Lemona's Tale. London: Penguin. ISBN 978-0-14-026086-1.
- —— (2005). A Bride for Mr B. London: Saros. ISBN 1-870716-26-4.
- —— (2018). Silence would be treason: Last writings of Ken Saro-Wiwa. Ottawa: Daraja Press. ISBN 978-1-988832-24-1.

A collection of handwritten letters and poems by Saro-Wiwa and audio recordings of visits and meetings with family and friends after his death were donated to Maynooth University by Sister Majella McCarron. The letters are now in the Digital Repository of Ireland (DRI).

== See also ==
- History of Nigeria
- Isaac Adaka Boro
- List of people from Rivers State
- Petroleum industry in Nigeria
- Esther Kiobel
- A Sangue Freddo (song) on Italian Wikipedia

== Sources ==
- Doron, Roy; Falola, Toyin (2016). Ken Saro-Wiwa. Ohio University Press. ISBN 9780821422014.
