= Kiobel v. Royal Dutch Petroleum Co. =

- Supreme Court of the United States

Argued February 28, 2012 Reargued October 1, 2012 Decided April 17, 2013
- Full case name: Kiobel, Individually and on behalf of her late husband Kiobel, et al. v. Royal Dutch Petroleum Co. et al.
- Docket no.: 10-1491
- Citations: 569 U.S. 108 (more) 133 S. Ct. 1659; 185 L. Ed. 2d 671; 2013 U.S. LEXIS 3159; 81 U.S.L.W. 4241
- Argument: Oral argument
- Reargument: Reargument

Case history
- Prior: Kiobel v. Royal Dutch Petroleum Co., 456 F. Supp. 2d 457 (S.D.N.Y. 2006); affirmed in part, reversed in part, 621 F.3d 111 (2d Cir. 2010); rehearing en banc denied, 642 F.3d 379 (2d Cir. 2011); certiorari granted, 565 U.S. 961 (2010).

Holding
- The presumption against extraterritoriality applies to claims under the Alien Tort Statute.

Court membership
- Chief Justice John Roberts Associate Justices Antonin Scalia · Anthony Kennedy; Clarence Thomas · Ruth Bader Ginsburg; Stephen Breyer · Samuel Alito; Sonia Sotomayor · Elena Kagan

Case opinions
- Majority: Roberts, joined by Scalia, Kennedy, Thomas, Alito
- Concurrence: Kennedy
- Concurrence: Alito, joined by Thomas
- Concurrence: Breyer (in judgment), joined by Ginsburg, Sotomayor, Kagan

Laws applied
- Alien Tort Statute, 28 U.S.C. § 1350

Kiobel v. Royal Dutch Petroleum Co., 569 U.S. 108 (2013), was a United States Supreme Court decision in which the court found that the presumption against extraterritoriality applies to claims under the Alien Tort Statute (ATS). According to the Court's majority opinion, "it would reach too far to say that mere corporate presence suffices" to displace the presumption against extraterritoriality when all the alleged wrongful conduct takes place outside the United States.

The Court did not rule out the possibility of corporate liability if the presumption against extraterritoriality could be overcome by acts that sufficiently "touch and concern" the United States. Lower court decisions were divided. After the Supreme Court's 2018 decision in Jesner v. Arab Bank, PLC ruled out an ATS cause of action against foreign corporate defendants, the significance of the "touch and concern" test remains unclear.

Kiobel is considered a 'foreign cubed' case in which foreign plaintiffs made a claim against a foreign company for human rights violations overseas.

== Background ==
The plaintiffs in Kiobel were Esther Kiobel and other citizens of Nigeria who claimed that Dutch, British, and Nigerian oil-exploration corporations aided and abetted the Nigerian government in the 1990s to commit violations of customary international law. The plaintiffs claimed that Royal Dutch Shell compelled Shell Nigeria its Nigerian subsidiary, in cooperation with the Nigerian government, in a brutal crushing of peaceful resistance to aggressive oil development in the Ogoni Niger River Delta.

Plaintiffs sought damages under the ATS. The defendants moved to dismiss based on a two-pronged argument. Firstly, they argued that customary international law itself provides the rules to decide whether conduct violates the law of nations where non-state actors are alleged to have committed the wrong in question. Second, they contended that no norm has ever existed between nations that imposes liability upon corporate actors.

On September 29, 2006, the district court dismissed the plaintiffs' claims for aiding and abetting property destruction; forced exile; extrajudicial killing; and violation of the rights to life, liberty, security, and association. It reasoned that customary international law did not define the violations with sufficient particularity. The court denied the defendants' motion to dismiss with respect to the remaining claims of aiding and abetting arbitrary arrest and detention; crimes against humanity; and torture or cruel, inhuman, and degrading treatment. The district court then certified its entire order for interlocutory appeal to the Second Circuit based on the serious nature of the questions at issue.

In a 2–1 decision issued on September 17, 2010, the U.S. Court of Appeals for the Second Circuit held that corporations cannot be held liable for violations of customary international law:

- Under both U.S. Supreme Court and Second Circuit precedents over the previous 30 years that address ATS suits alleging violations of customary international law, the scope of liability is determined by customary international law itself.
- Under Supreme Court precedent, the ATS requires courts to apply norms of international law, not domestic law, to the scope of defendants' liabilities. The norms must be "specific, universal and obligatory".
- Under international law, "corporate liability is not a discernible—much less a universally recognized—norm of customary international law," and the court could apply to the ATS. Also, the plaintiffs' ATS claims should indeed be dismissed for lack of subject matter jurisdiction.

Kiobel petitioned the Supreme Court for review of the Second Circuit's decision. It was granted on October 17, 2011. Oral arguments were held on February 28, 2012, with Kathleen Sullivan arguing for Shell and Deputy Solicitor General Edwin Kneedler arguing as a friend to Kiobel.

The arguments received considerable attention in the legal community.

Unexpectedly, the Supreme Court announced, on March 5, 2012, that it would hold additional argument on the case during the October 2012 term. It directed the parties to file new briefs on the question "Whether and under what circumstances the Alien Tort Statute, 28 U.S.C. § 1350, allows courts to recognize a cause of action for violations of the law of nations occurring within the territory of a sovereign other than the United States."

Reargument of the case occurred on October 1, 2012, with Sullivan reappearing for Shell and the United States Solicitor General Donald Verrilli now arguing as a friend to Kiobel.

== Decision ==
The Court, in an opinion joined by five justices, held that the presumption against extraterritoriality applies to claims under the ATS, and nothing in the statute rebuts that presumption. The presumption against extraterritoriality is a canon of statutory interpretation that provides there is no extraterritorial application of a statute unless there is a clear indication otherwise.

Writing for the Court, Chief Justice Roberts observed that while the presumption applies to merits questions and the ATS is strictly jurisdictional, the presumption against extraterritoriality should still apply to the statute because of the danger of judicial interference in foreign policy.

The Court further reasoned that nothing in the text, history or purposes of the ATS rebuts the presumption. The common law transitory torts doctrine, which holds that causes based on a transitory action arising abroad may be considered as happening domestically, helps rebut the presumption, as the statute may have other meanings.

The Court also disregarded a 1795 opinion by Attorney General William Bradford that "there can be no doubt" of tort liability for American citizens who had been plundering inside Sierra Leone. The Bradford Opinion was a response to British complaints about US citizens who violated a treaty between the United States and Britain by joining a French privateer fleet to attack a British Colony, in spite of an official US policy of neutrality. The Court said the opinion "defies a definitive reading and...hardly suffices to counter the weighty concerns underlying the presumption against extraterritoriality".

Finally, the Court found it would be implausible to suppose that the First Congress wanted to make the United States a "uniquely hospitable forum for the enforcement of international norms."

The Court noted that all conduct at issue in the case took place outside the United States and that "it would reach too far to say that mere corporate presence suffices" to displace the presumption against extraterritoriality, unless Congress determines otherwise in a statute more specific than the ATS.

=== Concurrences ===
Justice Kennedy separately wrote a one-paragraph concurrence noting that the presumption against extraterritorial application "may require some further elaboration and explanation."

Justice Alito, joined by Justice Thomas, agreed that the statute does not apply extraterritorially and argued that it should be read to apply to only the international law violations that had been identified by William Blackstone in 1769: violation of safe conducts, infringement of the rights of ambassadors, and piracy.

Justice Breyer, joined by Justices Ginsburg, Sotomayor and Kagan, concurred with the judgment but rejected the Court's reasoning. The four justices did not believe that the presumption against extraterritoriality applies to the ATS. Instead, the concurrence sees ATS jurisdiction as limited to when the tort occurs on American soil, the defendant is an American national, or when there is an important American national interest like not providing safe harbor to hostis humani generis, or the common enemy of mankind.

Breyer first attacks the majority's view that the presumption is not rebutted. He notes that while the majority sees the ATS as applying to piracy on the high seas, piracy necessarily occurs aboard a ship and so is considered to occur within the territory of the ship's flag state. He then outlines the long history of an international duty to not provide safe harbor to hostis humani generis, or the common enemy of mankind. He then reviews thirty years of U.S. Court of Appeals cases holding for extraterritorial application of the ATS. The concurrence takes issue with the majority's characterization of the ATS as "uniquely hospitable" by noting that many countries permit extraterritorial suits, citing Dutch, English, International Court of Justice, and European Commission sources. The Court's concern on unwarranted judicial interference in the conduct of foreign affairs is rejected by Breyer, who notes US obligations under the Convention Against Torture, the third Geneva Convention, the International Convention for the Protection of All Persons from Enforced Disappearance, and several other treaties.

Ultimately, however, the concurrence agrees with the Court's judgment, as the mere corporate presence of a foreign defendant does not invoke a national interest in denying safe harbor to a common enemy of mankind.

== Post-Kiobel cases ==
Lower courts have been left to answer which ATS claims "touch and concern the territory of the United States ... with sufficient force" to overcome the presumption against extraterritoriality, and this has been the subject of most post-Kiobel litigation in the lower courts.

Some of these cases are:

- Mastafa v. Chevron Corp, 770 F.3d 170 (2d Cir. 2014)
- Al Shimari v. Caci Premier Technology, 758 F.3d 516 (4th Cir. 2014),
- Doe v. Nestle S.A. 906 F.3d 1120 (9th Cir. 2018), reversed by Nestlé USA, Inc. v. Doe (2021)
- Baloco v. Drummond Co. Inc, 767 F.3d 1229 (11th Cir. 2014)
- Mujica v. AirScan Inc, 771 F.3d 580 (9th Cir. 2014)
- Cardona v. Chiquita Brands Int'l, Inc., 760 F.3d 1185 (11th Cir. 2014), Cert. Denied

== See also ==
- Bowoto v. Chevron Corp.
- Wiwa v. Royal Dutch Shell Co.
- Jesner v. Arab Bank, PLC
