= Jesner v. Arab Bank, PLC =

- Supreme Court of the United States

Argued October 11, 2017 Decided April 24, 2018
- Full case name: Joseph Jesner, et al., Petitioners v. Arab Bank, PLC.
- Docket no.: 16-499
- Citations: 584 U.S. 241 (more) 138 S. Ct. 1386; 200 L. Ed. 2d 612
- Argument: Oral argument

Case history
- Prior: Linde v. Arab Bank, PLC, 97 F. Supp. 3d 287 (E.D.N.Y. 2015); affirmed sub. nom., In re Arab Bank, PLC Alien Tort Statute Litig., 808 F.3d 144 (2d Cir. 2015); rehearing en banc denied, 822 F.3d 34 (2d Cir. 2016); cert. granted, 137 S. Ct. 1432 (2017).

Holding
- Foreign corporations may not be sued under the Alien Tort Statute in U.S. courts.

Court membership
- Chief Justice John Roberts Associate Justices Anthony Kennedy · Clarence Thomas; Ruth Bader Ginsburg · Stephen Breyer; Samuel Alito · Sonia Sotomayor; Elena Kagan · Neil Gorsuch

Case opinions
- Majority: Kennedy (Parts I, II–B–1, and II–C), joined by Roberts, Thomas, Alito, Gorsuch
- Plurality: Kennedy (Parts II–A, II–B–2, II–B–3, and III), joined by Roberts, Thomas
- Concurrence: Thomas
- Concurrence: Alito (in part)
- Concurrence: Gorsuch (in part)
- Dissent: Sotomayor, joined by Ginsburg, Breyer, Kagan

Laws applied
- Alien Tort Statute, 28 U.S.C. § 1350

Jesner v. Arab Bank, PLC, No. 16-499, 584 U.S. 241 (2018), was a case from the United States Supreme Court which addressed the issue of corporate liability under the Alien Tort Statute (ATS). Plaintiffs alleged that Arab Bank facilitated terrorist attacks by transferring funds to terrorist groups in the Middle East, some of which passed through Arab Bank's offices in New York City.

When deciding Kiobel v. Royal Dutch Petroleum the Supreme Court avoided the question of corporate liability, and the lower court's holding that ATS did not apply to foreign corporate defendants continued to have force as precedent in the Second Circuit. Accordingly, petitioner's ATS claims were dismissed by the District Court and the Supreme Court granted certiorari.

At issue in this case was whether the ATS allows foreign corporations to be sued in U.S. courts. The Supreme Court held, by a 5–4 vote, that foreign corporations cannot be sued under the Alien Tort Statute. The majority opinion was written by Justice Anthony Kennedy.

== Background ==
=== Factual background ===
Petitioners in this case (non-U.S. citizens) alleged that they or their relatives were victims of terrorist attacks in Israel, West Bank, and Gaza between 1995 and 2005. Following these events, they brought suit in U.S. courts against Arab Bank, a major financial institution in the Middle East with its headquarters in Amman, Jordan and over 600 branches around the world. Petitioners claimed that the bank facilitated the terrorist acts that caused injury to themselves and their families by maintaining accounts for terrorists and allowing funds to transfer through the bank to terrorist groups. In order to connect their claims to the U.S.—the location of the lawsuit—petitioners specifically alleged that Arab Bank processed transactions through its New York branch that benefited terrorists, and that the New York branch was used to launder money for a Texas-based charity with purported ties to Hamas.

Petitioners filed five separate lawsuits against Arab Bank in the United States District Court for the Eastern District of New York under the Alien Tort Statute, which allows foreign nationals to bring civil claims in U.S. federal district court. The district court dismissed the case based on the Second Circuit's decision in Kiobel v. Royal Dutch Petroleum Co. that corporations cannot be sued under the Alien Tort Statute. Petitioners then appealed this decision to the Second Circuit Court of Appeals, which affirmed the district court's ruling. The Supreme Court granted certiorari in October 2016 to consider whether the Alien Tort Statute allows suits against foreign corporations.

=== Legal history of the Alien Tort Statute ===
Enacted as part of the Judiciary Act of 1789, the ATS allows foreign nationals to bring lawsuits in U.S. district courts for torts "in violation of the law of nations or a treaty of the United States."

The Articles of Confederation did not grant the central government the authority to provide remedies to foreign citizens, which at that time caused substantial tensions in foreign-relations. In order to remedy this problem, the First Congress passed the Judiciary Act of 1789, which included what is now known as the Alien Tort Statute. As it stands, the text of the Alien Tort Statute reads: "The district courts shall have original jurisdiction of any civil action by an alien for a tort only, committed in violation of the law of nations or a treaty of the United States."

Though enacted in 1789, the Alien Tort Statute went largely unused for centuries, until 1980, with the case of Filártiga v. Peña-Irala. In Filártiga, a Paraguayan doctor filed suit in the U.S. against Americo Peña-Irala, a former Paraguayan police supervisor living in New York. The doctor claimed that Peña-Irala supervised and participated in the torture of his son. The case reached the Second Circuit Court of Appeals, where the central question before the court was whether torture was considered a violation of the law of nations, as required under the Alien Tort Statute. In a landmark decision, the Second Circuit found that torture did qualify as a violation of the law of nations and therefore U.S. courts had jurisdiction to decide the case under the Alien Tort Statute. This holding opened up U.S. courts to victims of human rights abuses that occurred outside the U.S. through the previously obscure Alien Tort Statute. After Filártiga, plaintiffs increasingly used the Alien Tort Statute to seek damages for human-right violations committed abroad. In 1996, the Second Circuit Court of Appeals again heard a case related to the Alien Tort Statute: Kadic v. Karadzic. The court's decision expanded liability under the Alien Tort Statute beyond state actors to include private actors, which opened the pathway for suits against non-state entities like corporations.

After a decades-long explosion of Alien Tort Statute litigation post-Filártiga, the Supreme Court began to place limits on the statute's jurisdiction in 2004 with the case of Sosa v. Alvarez-Machain. In Sosa, the Supreme Court held that courts may recognize "a narrow set of common law actions derived from the law of nations," which meet a "specific, universal, and obligatory" standard, but that the statute itself does not provide a cause of action. The court noted that while the door to "further independent judicial recognition of actionable international norms" is still "ajar," it must be subject to "vigilant doorkeeping" by the courts. Nine years later, the Supreme Court addressed questions on the extraterritoriality of the Alien Tort Statute in the Kiobel case. In Kiobel, the court held that the statute presumptively does not apply extraterritorially, but that petitioners can overcome this presumption if their claims "touch and concern" the U.S. with sufficient force. Therefore, foreign plaintiffs cannot bring claims against foreign defendants under the Alien Tort Statute for matters arising entirely outside of the U.S. The Supreme Court opinion did not, however, address the lower court's opinion as to whether corporations can be held liable under the Alien Tort Statute. Many legal scholars agree that the Supreme Court's decisions in both Sosa and Kiobel placed significant limitations on the scope of the Alien Tort Statute—a trend that continued with Jesner.

== Jesner Supreme Court Decision ==
=== Central holding ===
On April 24, 2018, in a 5–4 decision the majority ruled that foreign corporations cannot be sued under the Alien Tort Statute, affirming the lower court.

=== Reasoning ===
The majority's reasoning was driven in large part by separation of powers concerns, noting that the political branches traditionally have responsibility over foreign affairs. Kennedy stated that Congress, not the courts, "is in the better position to consider if the public interest would be served by imposing a new substantive legal liability," because such claims against foreign corporations brought in U.S. courts may impact U.S. foreign relations. Kennedy cited the amicus brief Jordan filed with the court as evidence of increased diplomatic tensions, which the First Congress sought to avoid through the creation of the Alien Tort Statute. Jordan, where Arab Bank is headquartered, characterized the Jesner case as a "grave affront" to its sovereignty that could "undermine its cooperation with the United States." Given these considerations, a five justice majority found "it would be inappropriate for courts to extend ATS liability to foreign corporations." They argued that Congress can explicitly legislate to allow lawsuits against foreign corporations under such circumstances if it wishes to do so.

The rest of Justice Kennedy's opinion only commanded the support of Justice Roberts and Justice Thomas, and therefore did not reach a majority. Kennedy, Roberts, and Thomas would have gone further than the majority, foreclosing ATS liability for all corporations. Kennedy's plurality opinion argued that there is no norm of corporate liability "under currently prevailing international law," as required in Sosa's "specific, universal, and obligatory" test, since international law only applies to the conduct of states and natural persons.

=== Concurrences ===
Justice Alito's concurring opinion emphasized the Alien Tort Statute's objective of "avoiding diplomatic strife" and urged the court to reject claims, such as those brought against foreign corporate defendants, that would not advance this congressional purpose. Justice Gorsuch's concurring opinion provided two reasons in support of the court's central holding that foreign corporations cannot be defendants under the Alien Tort Statute. First, Gorsuch argued that "separation-of-powers principles dictate that courts should never recognize new causes of action under the ATS," and second, that the statute requires a domestic defendant, whether a natural person or corporation.

=== Dissent ===
Justice Sotomayor wrote a dissenting opinion, in which she argued that the "text, history, and purpose of the ATS, as well as the long and consistent history of corporate liability in tort, confirm that tort claims for law-of-nations violations may be brought against corporations under the ATS." Justices Breyer, Ginsburg, and Kagan joined this dissent. Sotomayor wrote that “[n]othing about the corporate form in itself justifies categorically foreclosing corporate liability,” and that consequently, “[e]ach source of diplomatic friction that respondent Arab Bank and the plurality identify can be addressed with a tool more tailored to the source of the problem than a blanket ban on corporate liability.” Additionally, the dissent argued that Kennedy's plurality misapplied the Sosa test by conflating international law's substantive prohibitions on conduct with the mechanisms used to enforce these norms. The Sosa test requires that under the Alien Tort Statute, the violated international law norm must be "specific, universal, and obligatory." Sotomayor writes that this requirement is inapposite to the question of corporate liability, however, because it applies to the substantive prohibition in question, not mechanisms for enforcement. Furthermore, Sotomayor noted that members of the Executive branch and Congress filed briefs with the court supporting the imposition of corporate liability.

=== Significance ===
The Court's Jesner decision has led to a debate about how useful the Alien Tort Statute can be as a tool for civil human rights litigation going forward. The central holding leaves open the possibility of suits against domestic corporations or individual employees of foreign corporations, but others emphasize that very few cases will meet the heightened combination of requirements for Alien Tort Statute jurisdiction outlined in Sosa, Kiobel, and Jesner.
