= Alien Tort Statute =

US legislation

- Other short titles: Alien Tort Claims Act
- Acronyms (colloquial): ATS, ATCA
- Enacted by: the 1st United States Congress

Citations
- Statutes at Large: 1 Stat. 73

Codification
- Acts amended: Judiciary Act of 1789
- U.S.C. sections created: 28 U.S.C. § 1350

Legislative history
- Signed into law by President George Washington on September 24, 1789

United States Supreme Court cases
- Argentine Republic v. Amerada Hess Shipping Corp., 488 U.S. 428 (1989); Sosa v. Alvarez-Machain, 542 U.S. 692 (2004); Kiobel v. Royal Dutch Petroleum Co., 569 U.S. 108 (2013); Jesner v. Arab Bank, PLC, No. 16-499, 584 U.S. 241 (2018); Nestlé USA, Inc. v. Doe, No. 19-416, 593 U.S. 628 (2021); Cisco Systems, Inc. v. Doe, No. 24-856, 609 U.S. ___ (2026)

The Alien Tort Statute (codified into positive law in 1948 as 28 U.S.C. § 1350; ATS), also called the Alien Tort Claims Act (ATCA), is a federal law that gives federal courts jurisdiction over lawsuits filed by foreign nationals for torts committed in violation of international law. It was first introduced by the Judiciary Act of 1789 and is one of the oldest federal laws still in effect in the U.S.

The ATS was rarely cited for nearly two centuries after its enactment, and its exact purpose and scope remain debated. The U.S. Supreme Court has interpreted the Act's primary purpose as "[promoting] harmony in international relations by ensuring foreign plaintiffs a remedy for international-law violations in circumstances where the absence of such a remedy might provoke foreign nations to hold the United States accountable."

Since 1980, courts have generally interpreted the ATS to allow foreign nationals to seek remedies in U.S. courts for human rights violations committed outside the United States, provided there is a sufficient nexus to the United States. Both case law and jurisprudence differ on what characterizes a sufficient U.S. connection, particularly with respect to corporate entities.

== Text ==
The statute reads as follows:

The district courts shall have original jurisdiction of any civil action by an alien for a tort only, committed in violation of the law of nations or a treaty of the United States.

== History ==
The ATS was part of the Judiciary Act of 1789, which was passed by the First U.S. Congress to establish the federal court system. There is little surviving legislative history regarding the Act, and its original meaning and purpose are uncertain. Scholars have surmised that it was intended to assure foreign governments that the U.S. would seek to prevent and remedy breaches of customary international law, especially breaches concerning diplomats and merchants.

The ATS may have been enacted in response to a number of international incidents caused by the unavailability of remedies for foreign citizens in the U.S. The peace treaty ending the American Revolutionary War provided for the satisfaction of debts to British creditors, but several states refused to enforce the payment of such debts, prompting threats of retaliation by Great Britain. (Note: The controversy culminated in the 1796 U.S. Supreme Court case Ware v. Hylton, which concluded that the treaty's obligations superseded conflicting state law.) In 1784, French diplomat François Barbé-Marbois was assaulted in Philadelphia, but no legal remedy was available to him, as any prosecution was left to the discretion of local authorities. The incident was notorious internationally and prompted Congress to draft a resolution asking states to allow suits in tort for the violation of the law of nations; few states enacted such a provision, and Congress subsequently included the ATS in the Judiciary Act of 1789.

Until 1980, the ATS remained largely dormant, being invoked in only two reported court decisions.

Since 2013, the Supreme Court has "restricted the law's reach".

=== Revitalization: Filártiga v. Peña-Irala ===
In 1980, the U.S. Court of Appeals for the Second Circuit decided Filártiga v. Peña-Irala, which "paved the way for a new conceptualization of the ATS". In Filartiga, two Paraguayan citizens resident in the U.S., represented by the Center for Constitutional Rights, brought suit against a Paraguayan former police chief who was also living in the United States. The plaintiffs alleged that the defendant had tortured and murdered a member of their family, and they asserted that U.S. federal courts had jurisdiction over their suit under the ATS. The district court dismissed for lack of subject-matter jurisdiction, holding that the "law of nations" does not regulate a state's treatment of its own citizens.

The Second Circuit reversed the decision of the district court. First, it held that the ATS, which allowed jurisdiction in the federal courts over a suit between two aliens, was a constitutional exercise of Congress's power, because "the law of nations ... has always been part of the federal common law", and thus the statute fell within federal-question jurisdiction. Second, the court held that the contemporary law of nations had expanded to prohibit state-sanctioned torture. The court found that multilateral treaties and domestic prohibitions on torture evidenced a consistent state practice of proscribing official torture. The court similarly found that United Nations declarations, such as the Universal Declaration on Human Rights, manifested an expectation of adherence to the prohibition of official torture. The court therefore held that the right to be free from torture had become a principle of customary international law. However, one of the judges on the panel hearing the case later wrote that Filartiga "should not be misread or exaggerated to support sweeping assertions that all (or even most) international human rights norms found in the Universal Declaration or in international human rights treaties have ripened into customary international law enforceable in the domestic courts".

Since Filartiga, jurisdiction under the ATS has been upheld in dozens of cases.

=== First U.S. Supreme Court hearing: Sosa v. Alvarez-Machain ===
The first U.S. Supreme Court case to directly address the scope of the ATS was Sosa v. Alvarez-Machain in 2004. The plaintiff, Alvarez, brought a claim under ATS for arbitrary arrest and detention. He had been indicted in the United States for torturing and murdering a Drug Enforcement Administration officer. When the United States was unable to secure Alvarez's extradition, the United States paid Sosa, a Mexican national, to kidnap Alvarez and bring him into the U.S. Alvarez claimed that his "arrest" by Sosa was arbitrary because the warrant for his arrest only authorized his arrest within the U.S. The U.S. Court of Appeals for the Ninth Circuit held that Alvarez's abduction constituted an arbitrary arrest in violation of international law.

The Supreme Court reversed and clarified that ATS did not create a cause of action, but instead merely "furnish[ed] jurisdiction for a relatively modest set of actions alleging violations of the law of nations." Such actions must "rest on a norm of international character accepted by the civilized world and defined with a specificity comparable to the features of the 18th-century paradigms we have recognized." Although the scope of ATS is not limited to violations of international law recognized in the 18th century, with respect to recognizing contemporary international norms, the Court's opinion stated that "the judicial power should be exercised on the understanding that the door is still ajar, subject to vigilant doorkeeping."

In Alvarez's case, "a single illegal detention of less than a day, followed by the transfer of custody to lawful authorities and a prompt arraignment, violates no norm of customary international law so well defined as to support the creation of a federal remedy."

=== Ongoing controversy ===
Exercising legal jurisdiction in the United States over matters that occurred abroad is a controversial practice and some have suggested that Congress eliminate it. Others believe that a multilateral solution, including through either the Organisation for Economic Co-operation and Development or the UN, would be more appropriate.

== Scope of the statute ==
=== "Violation of the law of nations" ===
The Supreme Court held in Sosa v. Alvarez-Machain that the ATS provides a cause of action for violations of international norms that are as "specific, universal, and obligatory" as were the norms prohibiting violations of safe conducts, infringements of the rights of ambassadors, and piracy in the 18th century. Courts have found matters actionable under the ATS to include torture; cruel, inhuman, or degrading treatment; genocide; war crimes; crimes against humanity; summary execution; prolonged arbitrary detention; and forced disappearance.

Since Sosa, courts have struggled to define the level of specificity required for a norm to be actionable under the ATS. For example, subsequent to Sosa, the U.S. Court of Appeals for the Eleventh Circuit overturned prior lower-court decisions that had found cruel, inhuman, or degrading treatment actionable, noting that Sosa repudiated the International Covenant on Civil and Political Rights as a source of law under the ATS. Similarly, courts have held that economic, social, and cultural rights are too indeterminate to satisfy Sosa's specificity requirement. For example, in Flores v. Southern Peru Copper Corp., the Second Circuit stated that the rights to life and to health are too indeterminate to constitute a cause of action under the ATS.

The U.S. District Court for the Northern District of California, however, has held that the limits of a norm need not be defined with particularity to be actionable; rather, the norm need only be so defined that the particular acts upon which a claim is based certainly fall within the bounds of the norm. In Doe v. Qi, the court stated, "The fact that there may be doubt at the margins – a fact that inheres in any definition – does not negate the essence and application of that definition in clear cases." The court also described how to determine whether specific actions fall within the proscriptions of an international norm, holding that the actions alleged should be compared with actions that international adjudicatory bodies have found to be proscribed by the norm in question. It therefore examined decisions by institutions such as the Human Rights Committee, the European Court of Human Rights, and the African Commission on Human and Peoples' Rights to determine that pushing, hitting, and choking a plaintiff during one day of incarceration did not constitute cruel, unusual, or degrading treatment, whereas forcing a hand into a plaintiff's vagina did constitute cruel, inhuman, or degrading treatment.

=== Corporate liability under the statute ===
In 2011, there was a circuit split regarding whether corporations, as opposed to natural people, could be held liable under the ATS. In 2010, the Second Circuit Court of Appeals held in Kiobel v. Royal Dutch Petroleum Co. that "customary international law has steadfastly rejected the notion of corporate liability for international crimes" and thus that "insofar as plaintiffs bring claims under the ATS against corporations, plaintiffs fail to allege violations of the law of nations, and plaintiffs' claims fall outside the limited jurisdiction provided by the ATS". But the Seventh Circuit Court of Appeals, the Ninth Circuit Court of Appeals, and the D.C. Circuit Court of Appeals all ruled that corporate liability is possible under the statute.

The U.S. Supreme Court granted certiorari on October 17, 2011, to answer the question of corporate liability. After arguments on February 28, 2012, the Court ordered the case to be reargued the following term on the separate question of extraterritoriality. On April 17, 2013, in Kiobel v. Royal Dutch Petroleum Co., the Court issued a decision affirming the Second Circuit's decision, but on different grounds, holding that the ATS did not create jurisdiction for a claim regarding conduct occurring outside the territory of the United States, leaving the question of corporate liability unresolved.

In Jesner v. Arab Bank, PLC, the Supreme Court again revisited the question of corporate liability and ruled that foreign corporations may not be sued under the ATS. The only parts of the opinion that commanded a majority of the court, however, expressly limited its holding to suits against foreign corporations. The concurring opinions by Justices Alito and Gorsuch focused on foreign relations concerns with foreign corporations. Justice Alito expressly limited his concurrence to foreign corporations: "Because this case involves a foreign corporation, we have no need to reach the question whether an alien may sue a United States corporation under the ATS." Because the majority opinion was limited to foreign corporations, it is possible that Jesner does not settle the question of corporate liability for U.S. corporations.

== Prominent cases under the statute ==
=== Doe v. Unocal ===
In September 1996, four Burmese villagers filed suit against Unocal and its parent company, the Union Oil Company of California; in October 1996, another fourteen villagers also brought suit. The suits alleged various human rights violations, including forced labor, wrongful death, false imprisonment, assault, intentional infliction of emotional distress and negligence, all relating to the construction of the Yadana gas pipeline project in Myanmar, formerly Burma.

In 2000, the district court dismissed the case on the grounds that Unocal could not be held liable unless Unocal wanted the military to commit abuses, and that plaintiffs had not made this showing. Plaintiffs appealed and ultimately, shortly prior to when the case was to be argued before the Ninth Circuit en banc court in December 2004, the parties announced that they had reached a tentative settlement. Once the settlement was finalized in March 2005, the appeal was withdrawn and the district court opinion from 2000 was also vacated.

According to a joint statement released by the parties, while the specific terms were confidential, "the settlement will compensate plaintiffs and provide funds enabling plaintiffs and their representatives to develop programs to improve living conditions, health care, and education, and protect the rights of people from the pipeline region. These initiatives will provide substantial assistance to people who may have suffered hardships in the region."

=== Jesner v. Arab Bank, PLC ===
On April 3, 2017, the Supreme Court agreed to hear the case Jesner v. Arab Bank, PLC, which asks the question: "Whether the Alien Tort Statute ... categorically forecloses corporate liability". The case arose when plaintiffs and their families were injured by terrorist attacks in the Middle East over a ten-year period. American nationals brought their claim under the Anti-Terrorism Act, 18 U.S.C. § 2333(a), and foreign nationals brought their claim under the ATS. The plaintiffs alleged that Arab Bank helped finance terrorism by allowing Hamas and other terrorist groups to use bank accounts for terrorists and to pay the families of suicide bombers.

The District Court, following the Second Circuit decision in Kiobel that corporations are immune from liability under the ATS, dismissed the ATS suit. The Second Circuit, also adhering to Kiobel, affirmed.

On April 24, 2018, the Supreme Court ruled that foreign corporations may not be sued under the Alien Tort Statute. Justice Kennedy wrote for a splintered majority. In the majority opinion, the Court expressed its concern for foreign relations problems if the Court were to extend liability to foreign corporations. "For 13 years, this litigation has 'caused significant diplomatic tensions' with Jordan, a critical ally in one of the world's most sensitive regions ... These are the very foreign-relations tensions the First Congress sought to avoid." Justices Thomas, Alito, and Gorsuch concurred.

Justice Sotomayor wrote a 34-page dissent, arguing the decision "absolves corporations from responsibility under the ATS for conscience-shocking behavior". According to Sotomayor, immunizing corporations from liability "allows these entities to take advantage of the significant benefits of the corporate form and enjoy fundamental rights ... without having to shoulder attendant fundamental responsibilities."

=== Kiobel v. Royal Dutch Petroleum ===
The plaintiffs in Kiobel were citizens of Nigeria who claimed that Dutch, British, and Nigerian oil-exploration corporations aided and abetted the Nigerian government during the 1990s in committing violations of customary international law. The plaintiffs claimed that Royal Dutch Shell compelled its Nigerian subsidiary, in cooperation with the Nigerian government, to brutally crush peaceful resistance to aggressive oil development in the Niger River Delta. Plaintiffs sought damages under the ATS. The defendants moved to dismiss based on a two-pronged argument. First, they argued that customary international law itself provides the rules by which to decide whether conduct violates the law of nations where non-state actors are alleged to have committed the wrong in question. Second, they contended that no norm has ever existed between nations that imposes liability upon corporate actors. On September 29, 2006, the district court dismissed the plaintiffs' claims for aiding and abetting property destruction; forced exile; extrajudicial killing; and violation of the rights to life, liberty, security, and association. It reasoned that customary international law did not define those violations with sufficient particularity. The court denied the defendants' motion to dismiss with respect to the remaining claims of aiding and abetting arbitrary arrest and detention; crimes against humanity; and torture or cruel, inhuman, and degrading treatment. The district court then certified its entire order for interlocutory appeal to the Second Circuit based on the serious nature of the questions at issue.

In a 2–1 decision issued on September 17, 2010, the U.S. Court of Appeals for the Second Circuit held that corporations cannot be held liable for violations of customary international law, finding that: (1) under both U.S. Supreme Court and Second Circuit precedents over the previous 30 years that address ATS suits alleging violations of customary international law, the scope of liability is determined by customary international law itself; (2) under Supreme Court precedent, the ATS requires courts to apply norms of international law—and not domestic law—to the scope of defendants' liabilities. Such norms must be "specific, universal and obligatory"; and (3) under international law, "corporate liability is not a discernible—much less a universally recognized—norm of customary international law", that the court could apply to the ATS, and that the plaintiffs' ATS claims should indeed be dismissed for lack of subject matter jurisdiction.

Kiobel petitioned the Supreme Court for review of the Second Circuit's decision, and this was granted on October 17, 2011. Oral arguments were held on February 28, 2012, and the arguments received considerable attention in the legal community. Unexpectedly, the Court announced on March 5, 2012, that it would hold additional arguments on the case during the October 2012 term, and directed the parties to file new briefs on the question "Whether and under what circumstances the Alien Tort Statute ... allows courts to recognize a cause of action for violations of the law of nations occurring within the territory of a sovereign other than the United States." The case was reargued on October 1, 2012; on April 17, 2013, the Court held that there is a presumption that the ATS does not apply outside the United States.

=== Sarei v. Rio Tinto ===
In 2000, residents of the island of Bougainville in Papua New Guinea brought suit against multinational mining company Rio Tinto. The lawsuit is based on a 1988 revolt against Rio Tinto, and the plaintiffs allege that the Papua New Guinea government, using Rio Tinto helicopters and vehicles, killed about 15,000 people in an effort to put down the revolt. On October 25, 2011, the Ninth Circuit Court of Appeals, sitting en banc, issued a divided opinion holding that certain claims against a foreign corporation implicating the conduct of a foreign government on foreign soil could proceed under the ATS. The company filed a petition with the Supreme Court for review of the decision; on April 22, 2013, the Supreme Court remanded the case back to the Ninth Circuit for further consideration in the light of its decision in Kiobel.

=== Kpadeh v. Emmanuel ===
Charles McArthur Emmanuel (also known as "Chuckie Taylor" or "Taylor Jr."), the son of former Liberian president Charles Taylor, was the commander of the infamously violent Anti-Terrorist Unit (ATU), commonly known in Liberia as the "Demon Forces". In 2006, U.S. officials arrested Taylor upon entering the U.S. (via the Miami International Airport) and the Department of Justice later charged him based on torture he committed in Liberia. He was convicted of multiple counts of torture and conspiracy to torture and was sentenced to 97 years in prison. The World Organization for Human Rights USA and the Florida International University College of Law filed a civil suit in the Southern District of Florida on behalf of five of Taylor's victims pursuant to the Alien Tort Statute and the Torture Victim Protection Act. The plaintiffs won by default judgment as to liability on all counts, and in February 2010, following trial on damages at which Taylor appeared, the court found Taylor liable to the plaintiffs for damages of over $22 million.

=== Presbyterian Church of Sudan v. Talisman Energy, Inc. ===
On October 2, 2009, the Court of Appeals for the Second Circuit, in Presbyterian Church of Sudan v. Talisman Energy, Inc., held that "the mens rea standard for aiding and abetting liability in Alien Tort Statute actions is purpose rather than knowledge alone." In this case—which involves allegations against a Canadian oil company concerning its purported assistance to the government in Sudan in the forced movement of civilians residing near oil facilities—the court concluded that "plaintiffs have not established Talisman's purposeful complicity in human rights abuses". In reaching that conclusion, the Second Circuit stated that "the standard for imposing accessorial liability under the Alien Tort Statute must be drawn from international law; and that under international law a claimant must show that the defendant provided substantial assistance with the purpose of facilitating the alleged offenses."

=== Sinaltrainal v. Coca-Cola Company ===
On August 11, 2009, the Court of Appeals for the Eleventh Circuit issued a decision in Sinaltrainal v. Coca-Cola Company. In this case, plaintiffs alleged that Coca-Cola bottlers in Colombia collaborated with Colombian paramilitary forces in "the systematic intimidation, kidnapping, detention, torture, and murder of Colombian trade unionists". The district court dismissed the complaint and the Eleventh Circuit upheld that ruling. In doing so, the Eleventh Circuit relied upon the Supreme Court's recent Ashcroft v. Iqbal decision in addressing the adequacy of the complaint, which must have "facial plausibility" to survive dismissal, and noted that Rule 8 of the Federal Rules of Civil Procedure demands "more than an unadorned, the-defendant-unlawfully-harmed-me accusation". The Eleventh Circuit then applied the Iqbal standard to plaintiffs' allegations against Coca-Cola and held that they were insufficient to survive dismissal.

=== Bowoto v. Chevron Corp. ===
Nigerian villagers brought claims against Chevron Corporation regarding events that occurred on a Chevron offshore drilling platform in 1998, when Nigerian soldiers suppressed a protest against Chevron's environmental and business practices. The protesters, with the help of nonprofit organizations including the Center for Constitutional Rights, the Public Interest Lawyers Group, and EarthRights International, brought claims for wrongful death, torture, assault, battery, and negligence against Chevron, alleging that the company had paid the soldiers that landed on the platform and were therefore liable for the actions that they took. In December 2008, a jury found that Chevron was not liable.

=== Wang Xiaoning v. Yahoo! ===
In 2007, the World Organization for Human Rights USA filed a lawsuit against Yahoo! on behalf of Chinese dissidents Wang Xiaoning and Shi Tao (his mother Gao Qinsheng), claiming jurisdiction under the ATS. According to the complaint, Wang and Shi Tao used Yahoo! accounts to share pro-democracy material, and a Chinese subsidiary of Yahoo! gave the Chinese government identifying information that enabled authorities to identify and arrest them. The Complaint alleged that the plaintiffs were subjected to "torture, cruel, inhuman, or other degrading treatment or punishment, arbitrary arrest and prolonged detention, and forced labor".

Yahoo! settled the case in November 2007 for an undisclosed amount and agreed to cover the plaintiff's legal costs as part of the settlement. In a statement released after the settlement was made public, Yahoo! said that it would "provide 'financial, humanitarian and legal support to these families' and create a separate 'humanitarian relief fund' for other dissidents and their families".

=== Nestlé USA, Inc. v. Doe ===
A recent case concerning the ATS was John Doe I, et al. v. Nestle, which was heard by the Supreme Court on December 1, 2020, and decided June 17, 2021. Consolidated with Cargill, Inc. v. Doe, the case alleges that Nestlé and Cargill aided and abetted forced child labour in the Ivory Coast in connection with the harvesting of cocoa. The applicability of the ATS was interpreted by each circuit individually, with the Ninth and Fourth Circuits in support of investigating Nestle's liability, while the Second Circuit maintained that the Statute did not apply to corporate liability. In an 8–1 decision, the Supreme Court ruled that the U.S. federal judiciary lacked jurisdiction over the case due to neither corporate defendant having sufficient connections to the U.S. beyond "mere corporate presence".

The Nestle/Cargill ruling was assessed by international legal jurists as narrowing the scope of the ATS while failing to clarify whether or how corporate defendants may be liable under it. While the Court rejected "general corporate activity", such as the making of operational decisions, as insufficient U.S.-based conduct to establish jurisdiction under the Statute, it did not specify what activities or ties would meet the requirements. The Court rejected the defendants' argument to narrow the applicability of the ATS to abuses that take place on U.S. soil, and also disagreed with the Trump administration's amicus curiae brief asserting that there should be no aiding and abetting cause of action under the Statute.

=== Doe v. Cisco ===
On July 3, 2023, the Ninth Circuit issued a decision in Doe v. Cisco. In this case, Falun Gong practitioners alleged that they were victims of human rights abuses perpetrated by the Chinese Communist Party and enabled by the technological assistance of Cisco and two Cisco executives.

The Ninth Circuit affirmed the district court's dismissal of the plaintiffs' ATS claims against the Cisco executives. However, it reversed the dismissal of the plaintiffs' ATS claims against the corporate defendant, Cisco, and the dismissal of claims under the Torture Victim Protection Act (TVPA) against the Cisco executives.

The Ninth Circuit relied on the Supreme Court's decision in Nestlé to conclude that corporations can be held liable under the ATS. Citing the Supreme Court's ruling in Sosa, the court held that aiding and abetting liability is cognizable under the ATS. It ruled that "plaintiffs' allegations against Cisco were sufficient to meet the applicable aiding and abetting standard". The case was remanded for further proceedings. In September 2024, the Ninth Circuit denied Cisco's petition for rehearing and stated that the court had "faithfully applied the Sosa framework to the facts of this case". Cisco filed a certiorari petition with the Supreme Court in January 2025.

The Supreme Court heard oral argument on April 28, 2026. On June 23, 2026, in a 6-3 ruling, the Court reversed the Ninth Circuit decision and remanded the case for further proceedings. The Supreme Court held that federal courts may not create new causes of action to remedy violations of international law under the ATS. The Court further held that neither the ATS nor the TVPA imposes liability for aiding and abetting offenses.

=== Doe v. Exxon Mobil Corp. ===
John Doe VII v. Exxon Mobil Corp. (09–7125) is a lawsuit filed in the United States by 11 Indonesian villagers against ExxonMobil Corporation alleging that the company is responsible for human rights violations in the oil-rich province of Aceh, Indonesia. The case has broad implications for multinational corporations doing business in other countries. Indonesian security forces committed torture, rape, and murder against the plaintiffs and their families while under contract with ExxonMobil to guard the Arun gas field during the late 1990s and early 2000s; plaintiffs claim that Exxon is responsible for these atrocities.

ExxonMobil has tried to have the case dismissed nine times and dragged out litigation for over 20 years. In November 2021 plaintiffs' legal team filed a motion to set a trial date, and in July 2022, US District Judge Royce Lamberth denied ExxonMobil's motions to dismiss the case, clearing the way for the lawsuit to go to trial, although no trial date was set.

On May 15, 2023, the plaintiffs reached a confidential settlement with ExxonMobil, a week before the scheduled jury trial.

=== Aguinda v. Texaco, Inc. ===
Aguinda v. Texaco, Inc. was a class-action lawsuit against Texaco Petroleum. It was filed in 1993 by American human rights lawyer Steven Donziger on behalf of indigenous collectives in the Ecuadorian Amazon. The lawsuit sought compensation for "alleged environmental and personal injuries arising out of Texaco's oil exploration and extraction operations in the Oriente region between 1964 and 1992". Legal proceedings followed in courts in Ecuador and the United States for about a decade. The case was dismissed on May 30, 2001, on grounds of forum non conveniens (meaning that the case was outside the jurisdiction of US courts and should be heard in Ecuadorian or international courts).

Following dismissal of Aguinda v. Texaco in the US, plaintiffs filed Maria Aguinda Salazar v, ChevronTexaco Corp in Ecuador in 2003, which in turn led to other progeny cases including Republic of Ecuador v. ChevronTexaco Corp and Moi Vicente Enomenga Mantohue v. Chevron Corporation and Texaco Petroleum Company.

=== Bancoult v. McNamara ===
Bancoult v. McNamara, 445 F.3d 427 (D.C. Cir. 2006), was a lawsuit brought in the United States by Chagossians, the former inhabitants of the Chagos Archipelago, over their removal from the islands so that the United States could build a military base on Diego Garcia in the British Indian Ocean Territory. Olivier Bancoult, two other Chagossians and two Chagossian associations sued the United States and several current and former senior officials of the Departments of Defense and State, the first named being Robert S. McNamara, seeking damages and declaratory and injunctive relief.

The United States District Court for the District of Columbia dismissed the suit in December 2004. On April 21, 2006, the Court of Appeals for the D.C. Circuit affirmed, holding that all the claims presented nonjusticiable political questions. In an opinion by Judge Janice Rogers Brown, the court held that the way the islands were depopulated could not be separated from the unreviewable decision to build the base, describing the policy and its implementation as "a sort of Möbius strip". The Supreme Court denied certiorari on January 16, 2007.

=== Doe v. Chiquita Brands International ===
Doe v. Chiquita Brands International is a class-action lawsuit brought in the United States District Court of New Jersey, filed on June 13, 2007. The suit was filed by Colombian families represented by EarthRights International (ERI), together with the Colombian Institute of International Law (CIIL), and Judith Brown Chomsky, against the Cincinnati-based producer and distributor of Chiquita Brands International. The suit alleges that Chiquita funded and armed known terrorist organizations (as designated by the United States Secretary of State) in Colombia.

The 144 plaintiffs allege that terrorists funded by Chiquita Brands killed 173 individuals of whom the plaintiffs were legal representatives. The killings took place over a lengthy period of time from 1975 to 2004 and most occurred in the 1990s and 2000s.

Chiquita Brands has admitted in federal court that a subsidiary company (which was subsequently sold) paid Colombian terrorists to protect employees at its most profitable banana-growing operation. As part of a deal with prosecutors, the company pleaded guilty to one count of doing business with a terrorist organization. In exchange, the company will pay a $25-million fine and court documents will not reveal the identities of the group of senior executives who approved the illegal protection payments.

On June 10, 2024, Chiquita Brands International was found liable by a jury in United States Federal Court of financing the far-right paramilitary death squad United Self-Defense Forces of Colombia in the Antioquia and Magdalena Departments of Colombia.

=== Estate of Rodriquez v. Drummond Co. ===
Estate of Rodriquez v. Drummond Co., 256 F. Supp. 2d 1250 (N.D. Ala. 2003), was a lawsuit filed in the United States District Court for the Northern District of Alabama by relatives of dead workers who Drummond Company employed.

Sintraminergetica has sued Drummond Company for allegedly conspiring with paramilitary groups to exterminate the union. This suit was brought after years of claims of abuses ranging from forcing potential employees to undergo lie detector tests to reveal their political affiliation as a condition of employment, to the assassination of union leaders, their displacement from the mining zones, and accusations made against them of being guerilla supporters. On March 12, 2001, Valmore Locarno Rodriguez and Victor Hugo Orcasita Amaya, the president and vice president of the union local, were taken from a company bus en route from the mine to their homes. Locarno was assassinated with two shots to the head in front of his coworkers. Over the protests of the workers, Orcasita was taken away in a truck. The next day, his body was found, with obvious signs of torture. On October 5 of the same year, under similar circumstances, Gustavo Soler, the union's new president, was taken from a bus, taken away in a pick-up, tortured, and killed. His body was found on October 7 by people from the area.

The court ruled that Sintraminergetica has standing to bring suit against Drummond and the Colombian managers of the company under the Alien Tort Statute. The crimes that were claimed to be committed violated the International Labour Organization (ILO) pacts and agreements, and were also crimes against humanity and war crimes, according to U.S. and international law.

On June 21, 2007, the Birmingham News reported that the US district judge presiding over the case in Birmingham dismissed the wrongful death charges against Drummond. The company is still being tried for a war crimes claim filed under the U.S. Alien Tort Statute.

On July 26, 2007, jurors in the case found Drummond not liable for the deaths of the three union representatives and rejected the claims by Sintraminergetica that the company aided in the deaths.

Drummond Company claims it has brought many jobs to the country and a level of stability to the mostly impoverished small town (corregimiento) of La Loma, Cesar, which has suffered civil unrest and corruption scandals. The company established a village for the mine workers and their families to live. The Drummond family established a school in the town for the mine workers' children.

== See also ==
- Aut dedere aut judicare
- Torture Victim Protection Act
- Corporate accountability for human rights violations

== Sources ==
- Bancoult v. McNamara, 445 F.3d 427 (D.C. Cir. 21 April 2006).
- "Docket No. 06-502: Bancoult v. McNamara". Supreme Court of the United States. 16 January 2007. Certiorari denied, 549 U.S. 1166 (2007).
- "Bancoult et al. v. McNamara et al., No. 06-502 (January 16, 2007)". United States Reports (PDF). Vol. 549. Supreme Court of the United States. p. 1166.
