= Corrib gas controversy =

Protest campaign against an Irish gas project

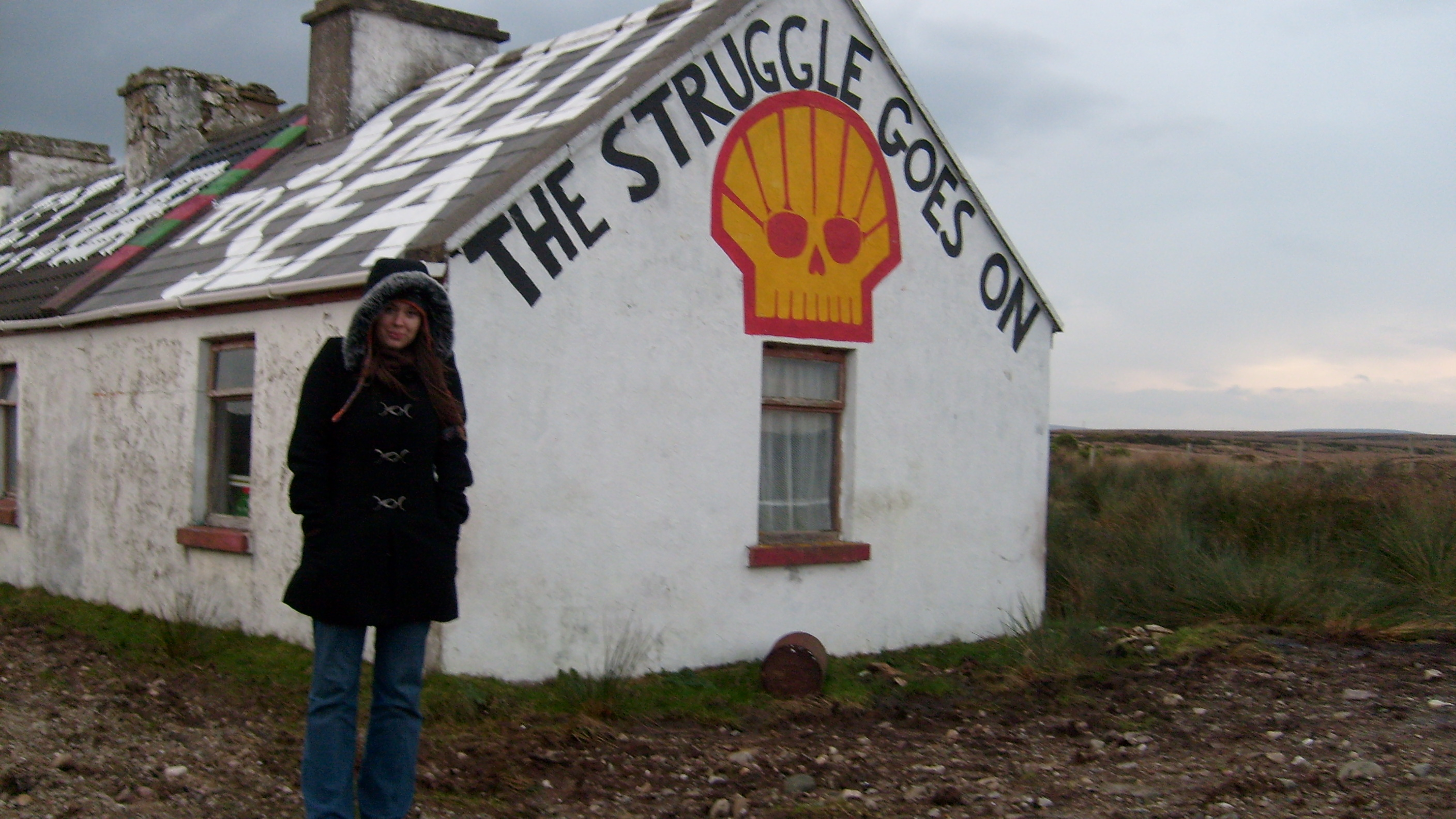
- Anti-Shell mural near Glenamoy, 2008
- Date: November 2000 – December 2015
- Location: County Mayo, Ireland
- Caused by: Environmental concerns; Lack of public consultation; Arrest of protesters; Alleged excessive use of force by Gardaí
- Status: Gas production commences in 2015; Shell withdraws in 2018; Activists continue to oppose the project

Parties
Government of Ireland; Royal Dutch Shell (2000-2018); Statoil Exploration (2000-2021); Vermilion Energy (2009-present)	Shell to Sea; Rossport Five; Pobal Chill Chomáin; Friends of the Irish Environment

The Corrib gas controversy was a social protest campaign against the Corrib gas project in north-western County Mayo, Ireland. The project involves the processing of gas onshore through Broadhaven and Sruth Fada Conn bays in Kilcommon. Originally spearheaded by local advocacy groups Shell to Sea and Pobal Chill Chomáin, the protests later grew to national prominence due to the heavy-handed approach taken by the Garda Síochána and private security firms towards the protestors. The project was jointly managed by Shell E&P Ireland and Statoil Exploration Limited, and supported by the Irish government.

Despite the opposition, onshore gas production commenced in December 2015, albeit significantly behind schedule. Shell announced the sale of their stake to the Canada Pension Plan Investment Board in July 2017, and were fully divested from the project by November 2018. At the time of their departure, the losses incurred by Shell on the project were estimated to be around €1 billion.

While the original aims of the protests were unsuccessful, Shell to Sea and other environmental groups continue to operate and highlight related issues. These include renegotiating the generous tax agreements made between oil and gas companies and the Irish government, the death of environmental activists worldwide, corruption by multinational oil companies and the campaign against fracking, including opposing the import of fracked liquefied natural gas from the United States.

== Background ==
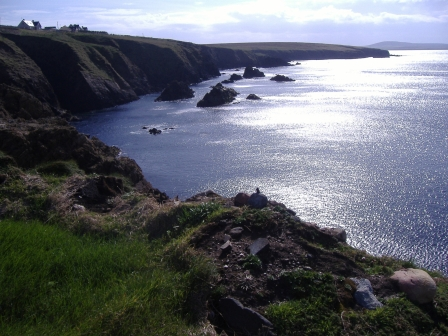
The pipeline makes landfall at Glengad, County Mayo

The Corrib gas project entails the extraction of a natural gas deposit off the northwest coast of Ireland. The project includes extraction of the Corrib gas field and construction of the natural gas pipeline and a gas processing plant. The project is controlled by Shell E&P Ireland as operator of the project, in co-operation with Statoil Exploration (Ireland) Limited, and the Vermilion Energy Trust.

The deepwater exploration licence No. 2/93 for 11 years, covering four blocks in the Slyne Trough, was granted on 1 January 1993 to Enterprise Oil. The licence was issued under the licensing terms for offshore oil and gas exploration and development 1992. The Corrib natural gas field was discovered in 1996. It was the first reported commercial natural gas discovery in Ireland since the Kinsale Head gas field was discovered in 1973. The first appraisal well was drilled in 1997. A number of consents and approvals to develop the Corrib Project were issued in 2001.

In 2002, Enterprise Oil was acquired by Royal Dutch Shell who took over the operatorship of the project. Development of the project began in 2004.

Worries about the nature of the Corrib deal prompted calls for an inquiry as early as 2001.

== Controversy ==
There have been several concerns put forward about the project, ranging from public opposition to environmental and political groups raising concerns. The controversy has stemmed from many points:

- Local residents along the course of the proposed pipeline route felt they were not sufficiently consulted
- The location of the pipeline and its proximity to houses caused concern
- The transmission pressure and untreated nature of the gas in the pipeline
- The location of the onshore processing facility on former forestry land within the local water supply catchment area
- Jailing for civil contempt of protesters at the request of Shell
- Concerns about the impact on marine ecology
- Most people who live in County Mayo believe that the gas processing should be carried out at sea. Some are also concerned with irregularities in the policies and conduct regarding the project.

=== Planning problems ===
In November 2000, a planning application was submitted for an onshore terminal at Bellanaboy to Mayo County Council (MCC). In January 2001 MCC sought more information after local concerns were raised. In April 2001, a new planning application was submitted, and in June 2001, the MCC sought more information which was supplied to them in July. In July, the Minister for the Marine and Natural Resources, Frank Fahey hosted a public meeting on offshore licensing aspects of Corrib in Geesala, County Mayo. In August 2001, MCC granted planning permission for the onshore terminal, with conditions. This was immediately appealed to An Bord Pleanala by local residents and environmental groups.

The same month, Minister Fahey stated that the objectors were holding up progress in the region. The planning decision, according to a Channel Four documentary, resulted from "huge pressure" that had been exerted on it. This decision was immediately appealed to An Bord Pleanála (ABP) by local people and environmental groups. In 2002, planning permission for a proposed refinery in County Mayo was refused by the appeals board after Senior Planning Inspector Kevin Moore concluded that "From a strategic planning perspective, this is the wrong site; from the perspective of Government policy which seeks to foster balanced regional development, this is the wrong site; from the perspective of minimising environmental impact, this is the wrong site; and consequently, from the perspective of sustainable development, this is the wrong site".

Then Minister for Marine and Natural Resources Frank Fahey told the media that this refusal was "just a hitch". He was backed by local Fine Gael TD, Enda Kenny, but opposed by another local Fine Gael TD, Michael Ring. In 2002 a Rossport resident failed in a High Court challenge to halt the pipeline.

In 2003, senior executives from Shell acquired an interview with then Taoiseach Bertie Ahern and other Irish government ministers. Within a week, Ahern met with the board of An Bord Pleanála, who are appointed by the government. In December 2003, a new planning application was made for the same site, together with a peat storage site some 11 km away. This was subject to an appeal to An Bord Pleanála who granted permission in October 2004, attaching 42 conditions. The board decided to ignore many of its own inspector's recommendations. Not long before, a huge landslide swept away the whole surface area of a mountain close to the intended pipeline route. Planning permission was not required for the onshore pipeline under the Gas Act 1976.

In November 2009, An Bord Pleanála ordered Shell to redesign the pipeline and move its route away from homes because it posed an "unacceptable risk".

== Opponents and supporters ==
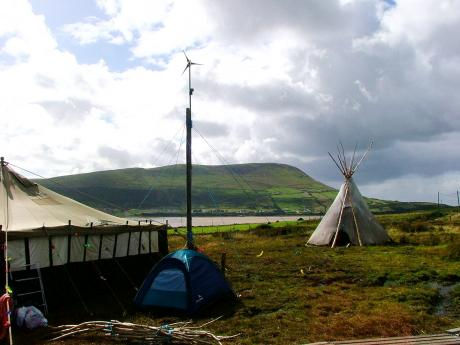
Activist camp on the proposed pipeline route, February 2007

The Shell to Sea campaign, which is campaigning to have the gas processed at sea rather than inland, began during the imprisonment of the Rossport Five in 2005. It is an active group in the affected Kilcommon parish. Shell to Sea also has many supporters outside of the immediately affected area from across County Mayo and the rest of Ireland, as well as abroad. Shell to Sea have a website that is updated frequently. They refuse to be participants in the North West Development Forum (known as the Corrib Gas Forum or known locally as the 'Funny Forum') at which government ministers, Royal Dutch Shell and Mayo County Council hold occasional meetings, as the Forum refuses to consider the aspects of the project that people find most objectionable.

Pobal Chill Chomáin, a group of local residents who live in the affected area of Kilcommon parish and live on both sides of Sruwaddacon Bay, also oppose the current plans for the project, due to concerns about the health, safety and environmental impact of the onshore aspects of the scheme and cite Shell's record in similar projects. They also refuse to participate in the North West Development Forum.

Pobal Le Chéile is a local alliance of small and medium-sized local business people mainly from the Erris region who also oppose the current plans for the project. Unlike other local business people, they have refused to take money or gifts from Shell. They work closely with Pobal Chill Chomáin and have also refused to participate in the Forum.

The Pro Gas Mayo Group (PGMG) was a small pressure group based in County Mayo and successor to the Pro Erris Gas Group. It considered the Shell to Sea campaign to be threatening employment in Mayo. It had three known members, Pádraig Cosgrove (from Bangor Erris), Harry Walsh (from Kilmaine, some 100 miles from the affected area), a former non-party councillor on Mayo County Council, and Brendan Cafferty from Ballina (a former Garda). None of its known members reside in the affected community of Kilcommon Parish.

A poll conducted throughout the county by TNS/MRBI on behalf of RTÉ's Nuacht in September 2006 showed that 60% of respondents agreed the gas processing terminal should be located offshore, with 23% supporting Shell and the government's decision to build inland. The offshore alternative had strongest support amongst those aged under 49 years, and those residing in Castlebar/Ballinrobe/Claremorris and Westport/Belmullet areas.

Many environmental activists criticised the Green Party for joining Fianna Fáil in coalition after the 2007 general election, as the terms of the programme for government did not include a reversal or renegotiation of the proposed gas pipeline and refinery. Before being appointed as Minister for Communications, Energy and Natural Resources, Eamon Ryan publicly supported the aims of the Shell to Sea campaign and the Rossport Five, and also attended their protests. The Green Party was also criticised for failing to launch an independent review of the decision, as stipulated by the party in a motion passed at their annual convention in 2007. The motion, passed at the February 2007 annual conference in Galway, said that "...the Green Party in government will not approve a production pipeline consent being signed as part of the Corrib gas project until the completion of a full independent review of the best development concept for the concept."

== Opposition (1998–2004) ==
In 1998 there were complaints from unions about the failure to employ Irish workers on the exploration rig SEDCO 711. Enterprise Oil contended that union wage rates offshore Ireland were two to three times higher than in the North Sea. The budget was £20 million for 2008 cumulatively £50 million. A spokesman said "Everybody is on tight budgets and we have got to do it cost effectively. Just because there is a big job doesn't mean there is slush to be thrown around for good social causes". Mike Cunningham, a gas and oil consultant based in Castlebar, said "It is now time for the companies to acknowledge that they have an ethical and moral duty not only to our local regulatory bodies but to the ordinary people of this region to come here and publicly debate all issues relating to their current and future exploration activities off our coastline". Minister for the Marine and Natural Resources Frank Fahey warned that apart from the construction stages very few jobs would be created. Sub-sea technology was to be used to bring the gas (which lies forty miles off the Mayo coast) to land, in contrast to the more commonly used production platforms. Strong objections were raised to the building of a gas refinery from the residents of Ballinaboy and Lenamore. The villagers said all sixteen of their households in the remote villages are within 1 km of the proposed refinery and that some houses are as close as 360 metres. In 2001 Enda Kenny TD, speaking in the Dáil, raised the concerns of the Erris Inshore Fishermen's Association about the effect of the discharge pipe from the terminal at Ballinaboy. In 2003 an offshore terminal was mooted as a solution to the Corrib gas planning crux.

== Protests (2005–2008) ==
Confrontation between Gardaí and protesters, June 2007

In January Shell sent registered letters to a number of land owners, who were denying the company access to their land, that they would take court action against them. Following the granting of planning permission, local people started blockading the terminal site and compounds set up for pipeline construction. On 4 April 2005 Shell obtained a high court order restraining protesters from restricting access to its Rossport compound. In the week of 20 June it obtained a temporary injunction. On 29 June Shell sought a committal order against five people for breach of the temporary injunction. This led to the imprisonment of the five men who became known as the Rossport Five. An Independent TD (member of Irish Parliament), Jerry Cowley liaised regularly with members of the Rossport Five while they were in jail. It is important, as a matter of historical record, that the Shell to Sea campaign did not arise following the jailing of the 5 men; the name Shell to Sea was adopted in January 2005 and therefore precedes the jailing later in that year. Shell to Sea, together with the Solidarity Camp, formed the backbone of resistance to and raising awareness of what was happening in north Mayo.A 300 km 'Long Walk' from Rossport, Co Mayo to Dublin took place in August 2006 to highlight opposition to the project. It took 12 days.

Integrated Risk Management Services (I-RMS), a security firm employed by Shell, began working in Glengad in the summer of 2008. Security men caused controversy when local journalists reported on them filming children swimming near Shell's Glengad compound in the summer of 2008. Local parish priest Fr. Michael Nallen told media that the security men made his parishioners prisoners in their own area.

On 9 September 2008, Maura Harrington began a hunger strike in protest at the arrival of the pipe-laying ship Solitaire into Broadhaven Bay, and stated she would refuse food until the vessel left Irish waters. She ended her protest on 19 September, after the ship was damaged and had to leave Ireland for repairs.

On the night of 15 September 2008, a suspect package consisting of a plastic bag containing a bottle of petrol, a clock and a can of paint was found outside the Dublin HQ of Shell.

== Garda operation ==
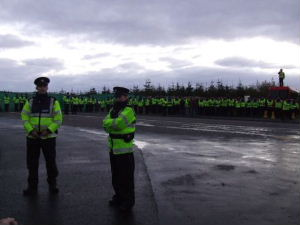
Gardaí guard the Bellanaboy terminal site from occupation by protesters

After the Rossport Five were jailed for contempt of court in the summer of 2005 for refusing to allow Shell workers access to their lands, supporters illegally blockaded all project works around Kilcommon in protest. The recently formed Shell to Sea campaign took part in the campaign with the aim of having the gas refined offshore as is done in Kinsale Head gas field, although Shell state there are numerous technical and economic reasons why it should be processed onshore. These blockades were maintained until October 2006, when 170 Gardaí used force to remove protesters blockading the sites.

Previous to this, the Gardaí had not interfered with the blockades, which stayed in place for fifteen months. The decision to use physical force to break the blockades made national TV news in Ireland. Some Gardaí and protesters were hospitalised, and many protesters claimed the police used excessive force. Gardaí were also accused of operating a "no-arrest policy" to circumvent the judicial process (this was based on comments made by Superintendent Joe Gannon in an interview in Garda Review, in which he stated: "There were no arrests. That was part of our strategy; we did not want to facilitate anyone down there with a route to martyrdom.")

The Garda operation succeeded in its goal of breaking the blockades preventing work on the refinery site at Bellanaboy. Work there has continued (with brief pauses occasioned by site occupations and lock-ons) since. At times, hundreds of Gardaí have been deployed to facilitate the project. There have been many reports of intimidation of local people by Gardaí and Shell security. Allegations of intimidation by Shell to Sea supporters of Shell workers have also been made.

=== Glengad ===
In July 2008, preparatory work for the raw gas pipeline began in Glengad. Under Gilligan's superintendency over forty arrests were made in the summer of 2008. The Irish Navy were brought in to provide assistance in dealing with possible protests on water. Local businessman and fisherman Pat O'Donnell accused the Gardaí of selective policing, alleging that they made no answer to call for assistance in defending his private property, in the form of crab pots that were in the path of the pipe laying vessel, Solitaire. Gardaí arrested O'Donnell and his son twice in a 24-hour period from the sea on public order charges, but desisted when their solicitor requested they charge their clients or stop arresting them.

The Garda Water Unit were used to manage the actions of water-based protesters who sought to disrupt the Shell works. Shell's survey boats in Srahwuddacon Bay in Erris were accompanied at all times by several Gardaí in their own boat, when surveying feasible routes for the gas pipeline. In August and September 2008, members of the unit entered the sea to wrestle with Shell to Sea protesters near the Shell compound of Glengad beach.

By September 2008, the cost of the operation was €10 million and is estimated to have cost €13.5 million by the end of January 2009.

Pobal Chill Chomáin have also complained of Garda surveillance.

=== Involvement of the Garda Síochána Ombudsman Commission ===
The Garda Síochána Ombudsman Commission (GSOC) has recommended that disciplinary action be taken against an unnamed senior member of the Garda Síochána in relation to the handling of the protest. The GSOC investigation was undertaken under section 95 of the Garda Síochána Act, 2005, after receipt of complaints over Garda handling of a protest at Pollathomas pier in June 2007. Some 20 civilians and two gardaí were injured when a landowner objected to trespass on his property by contractors for Shell EP Ireland. The GSOC initially asked the Minister for Justice whether it could investigate the complaints under section 106 of the Garda Síochána Act. This was turned down by the Minister. Some 68 gardaí were contacted by the GSOC – a move criticised by the Association of Garda Sergeants and Inspectors.

=== Rape tape (2011) ===
In April 2011, a senior Garda officer was appointed to investigate the treatment of two women who were arrested during protests. Gardaí were recorded on a video camera they had earlier confiscated joking about threatening to deport and rape one of the women.

== Opposition (2009–2010) ==
In April 2009, protesters removed sections of a fence they asserted were erected illegally. On 23 April, Willie Corduff, a Pobal Chill Chomáin member, was hospitalised in the early hours of the morning after an alleged assault by masked people during a protest at the Glengad Shell works. I-RMS later confirmed that employees had intended to remove Corduff, but found him standing up, and had him taken away by ambulance when he complained of chest pains. The recent Frontline report has found that the assault on Willie Corduff needs to be reinvestigated by Gardaí from outside of County Mayo as I-RMS claims are not corroborated by ambulance and hospital records which verify that his injuries are consistent with having been physically assaulted. Two films have been made in the locality: Pipe Down, which won the Best Feature Documentary at the Waterford Film Festival (2009) and The Pipe, which was released on 8 July 2010 at the Galway Film Festival film and winner at the Waterford Film Festival (2010).

In an effort to try and resolve the issues, the OECD is to host talks between Pobal Chill Chomáin and Shell Ireland, following a complaint from Pobal Chill Chomáin that the project violates OECD guidelines for multinational companies.

Following a prolonged oral hearing in the Broadhaven Bay Hotel in Belmullet in May and June 2009 chaired by An Bord Pleanala many discrepancies were uncovered in Shell & partners' plans for Kilcommon parish and their plans were rejected once again by the Board chairman. They were told to devise a new plan to be submitted by October 2009 and after several extensions of time, RPS Group on behalf of the Corrib Gas partners, eventually submitted a new Environmental Impact Statement to the Planning Board on 31 May 2010, a plan which this time, envisages laying the Corrib gas pipeline buried under the length of Sruwaddacon Bay. On 30 June 2010 the Corrib gas project placed three separate planning notices for the project in national and local newspapers giving one month in which submissions can be entered. They also incorporated Glengad into their latest planning application, which was omitted from previous applications. Their maps of the proposed Corrib Gas pipeline also omit most of this well populated townland in which Shell intends to place some of its most contentious components. It is expected that another oral hearing will then be held to discuss this variation in early autumn.

The Corrib Gas partners commenced the boring of 80 boreholes in Sruwaddacon Bay in 2010 to see what the substrate underlying Sruwaddacon Bay is like.

== Operation (2015 and beyond) ==
Gas production at the project began in December 2015.

In 2018, Shell exited the project, selling its ownership stake to the Canada Pension Plan Investment Board and transferring operatorship to minority owner Vermilion Energy.

As of 2021 the scope of Shell to Sea in relation to the project has shifted to financial and tax issues. The Irish government has no state shareholding in the gas field and the project has been termed "The Great Gas Giveaway" by Shell to Sea, with activists Andy Storey and Michael McCaughan stating:

A generous (to the companies) tax rate of only 25 per cent applies – and even that low tax rate only kicks in after a company’s exploration and development costs (and the estimated costs of closing down the operation when the resources are depleted) have been recovered.

The various environmental groups involved in the protests continue to agitate for related issues, such as the death of Shell workers in developing countries, the banning of imported fracked-gas into Ireland as well as highlighting funding from "Big Oil" to corrupt and abusive governments worldwide.

== Book ==
Transworld Ireland published Once Upon a Time in the West – The Corrib Gas Controversy by The Irish Times journalist Lorna Siggins in October 2010. Jon Michael Riley's novel Dream the Dawn (2014) is a fictionalized version of the protest as seen by an American photographer.
