= Maura Harrington =

Irish activist

- Born: 15 September 1953 (age 72)
- Occupation: Former school principal
- Known for: Opposition to Royal Dutch Shell's Corrib gas project
- Movement: Shell to Sea

Maura Harrington (born 15 September 1953) is a spokesperson for the Shell to Sea campaign, from County Mayo, Ireland. A retired school principal of Inver National School, she has been jailed on a number of occasions for her involvement in Shell to Sea protests.

== Campaign work ==
Harrington has previously been involved in fundraising for the British Miners' Strike, as well as campaigning against the Maastricht Treaty.

On 12 October 2006, Harrington sustained head and neck injuries while Gardaí cleared demonstrators blocking an access road used by Shell workers on the Corrib gas project.

Harrington has described herself as a Marxist.

On 9 September 2008, she began a hunger strike in protest at the arrival of the Solitaire, an Allseas pipe-laying ship assisting Royal Dutch Shell. The strike took place at the gates of the Shell compound in Glengad in Erris, in her car. It ended after the ship left Ireland for repairs. She appeared in Belmullet District Court on 8 October 2008 accused of a public order offence related to a protest when President Mary McAleese attended the official opening of a civic centre in Belmullet in April 2007. In March 2009, she was found guilty of this charge. She was also found guilty of assaulting a Garda during a fracas which saw several protesters injured. For this, she was given a sentence of 28 days imprisonment, fined and bound to keep the peace for 12 months, though she opted not to pay the fine or sign the bond. The judge in the case, Mary Devins, wife of the Fianna Fáil TD Jimmy Devins, also directed Harrington to receive a psychiatric assessment due to what she described as her "bizarre" behaviour an order which received criticism, with Senator David Norris comparing the decision to the tactics used in Stalinist dictatorships in Eastern Europe where political dissidents were portrayed as mentally ill. Harrington denied both charges, and did not give evidence in protest after Judge Devins refused to allow video evidence of the incident to be shown. She served her sentence in Dublin's Mountjoy Prison. Protests and other events took place outside the prison in solidarity, as well as at the offices of the Department of Justice, Equality and Law Reform.

On 6 April 2009, Harrington was due to speak at an event in London organised by Amnesty International to highlight the forthcoming Wiwa family lawsuits against Royal Dutch Shell, but was unable to because of her imprisonment. In July 2009, Harrington was jailed for four months for public order offences relating to demonstrations, a sentence which was appealed.

In February 2010, Judge Raymond Groarke accused Harrington of being like a member of "the secret police" following a period when the local area saw an influx of many Integrated Risk Management Services guards.

In December 2018 Maura Harrington was a speaker at a protest held in Strokestown, County Roscommon, where roughly 1,000 people gathered to protest against the eviction of a family from their home. Video footage of the eviction had gone viral in Ireland and lead to much criticism after it depicted security contractors from Northern Ireland removing the family by force. Subsequently, the security contractors were attacked at a second location, leading to multiple arrests. It was reported that Harrington instructed the crowd to operate in secret, but not to do anything for which they could be arrested for and "to take care no one be killed".
