= Shell to Sea =

Activist organisation in County Mayo, Ireland

- Abbreviation: S2S
- Type: Environmental/resource nationalist campaign
- Purpose: Environmentalism; resource nationalism
- Headquarters: Kilcommon, Erris, County Mayo
- Location: Ireland
- Website: https://web.archive.org/web/20130516224115/http://shelltosea.com/content/overview-corrib-gas-project

Members of the Garda Síochána and Shell to Sea campaigners scuffled over ownership of a road in June 2007. Gardaí eventually conceded the road was private property.

Shell to Sea (Irish: Shell chun Sáile) is an Irish organisation based in the parish of Kilcommon in Erris, Ireland. It opposes the proposed construction of a natural gas pipeline through the parish, as well as the ongoing construction—by Royal Dutch Shell, Statoil, and Vermilion Energy Trust—of a refinery at Bellanaboy near Belmullet, Ireland intended to refine the natural gas from the Corrib gas field. It proposes the gas be refined at sea, rather than inland, as is done with Ireland's only other producing gas field off County Cork. Shell to Sea believes the proximity of a raw natural gas pipeline is a risk to local residents.

The three aims of the campaign, as cited on its website, are as follows.

- Any exploitation of the Corrib gas field be done in a safe way that will not expose the local community in Erris to unnecessary health, safety, and environmental risks
- To renegotiate the terms of the Great Oil and Gas Giveaway, which sees Ireland's 10 billion barrel of oil equivalent off the West Coast go directly to the oil companies, with the Irish State retaining a 0% share, no energy security of supply and only 25% tax on profits against which all costs can be deducted
- To seek justice for the human rights abuses suffered by Shell to Sea campaigners due to their opposition to Shell's proposed refinery.

Incidents of note include the 2005 jailing of the Rossport Five and the public outcry which ensued, the 2007 Goldman Environmental Prize received by Willie Corduff (one of the five), local fisherman Pat O'Donnell's laying of 800 crab pots at sea, Maura Harrington's hunger strike against the Allseas pipe-laying ship Solitaire in 2008, an alleged assault on Corduff in 2009 which was condemned by Desmond Tutu, the 2011 "rape tape" scandal when Gardaí (police) accidentally filmed themselves joking about the imagined rape of two female protestors after arresting them, and the reports of gifts of alcohol worth tens of thousands of euros from Shell to the Gardaí, which broke in 2013.

== Timeline ==
Opposition to the gas consortium and government's plans among local residents grew from 2000 when local residents felt they were not adequately consulted. They opposed planning permission and appealed it to An Bord Pleanála twice. It was felt that government pressure was used to force the planning permission through. They felt misled about the safety of the gas pipeline which did not require planning permission under the 1976 Gas Act.

=== 2005 ===
The first event organised by Shell to Sea was on the June Bank Holiday weekend in 2005 in support of Rossport residents' protests. Local landowners in Rossport had previously been told that the raw gas pipeline would be coming through their lands no matter what, and that they would be subject to Compulsory Acquisition Orders if unwilling to reach a deal with Shell. Some agreed to allow Shell on their lands. Others refused and Frank Fahey, the Minister for the Marine and Natural Resources, signed 34 Compulsory Acquisition Orders. Those who had refused were threatened with legal action. Legal action was taken which eventually culminated in four farmers and their former teacher, who had joined them in blocking Shell workers coming on their lands, being jailed on 29 June for civil contempt of court (at the request of Shell) after refusing to give an undertaking not to interfere with Shell's workers. They became known as the Rossport Five.

Round the clock pickets on the Shell sites at Rossport, Bellanaboy, and Glengad began after the protesters' jailing. Rallies in support of the men's stance were held in major towns and cities; Shell and Statoil filling stations were picketed. From the protests emerged the national Shell to Sea campaign.

The Rossport Five were released on 30 September, after their imprisonment had dominated proceedings in the parliament. Peter Cassells was appointed as a negotiator to arbitrate between the campaigners and Shell. As his remit did not include discussing the refinery, he was regarded as a distraction by Shell to Sea. The pickets at Bellanaboy continued for over a year, during which no work was done by Shell.

=== 2006 ===
On Tuesday 26 September 2006, protesters prevented Shell's employees from entering the site of the intended refinery at Bellanaboy to begin work. Around 150 locals and protesters blocked the entrance to the refinery site and began to recite the rosary. The workers turned back after discussions with Gardaí.

A week later on 3 October, more Gardaí were brought in from around the country, which increased their numbers to around 170. That marked a departure in Garda tactics which they have held to. An editorial in The Irish Times said, "The Garda Baton charges that occurred on Friday morning in Bellanaboy were not the product of Sinn Féin or Provisional IRA machinations; they were the product of abject Government incompetence." A decision to avoid arresting protesters in order to damp down the negative publicity that would ensue was discussed in the Garda magazine, Garda Review. A number of people were injured and one young woman was brought to hospital. Protesters occupied Shell Ireland's headquarters on Dublin's Leeson Street and daily protests continued at Bellanaboy with some arrests made.

A second large scale protest march was held on 10 November, the anniversary of the execution of Ken Saro Wiwa and eight other anti-Shell activists in Nigeria in 1995. When protesters worked their way around Gardaí lines, clashes occurred, resulting in several injuries. Small groups of demonstrators who had been unable to get to the refinery attempted to blockade the nearby Lennon's quarry which supplies material for the construction of the site.

There was political controversy in Ireland about the use of force on a peaceful demonstration. Taoiseach Bertie Ahern, leader of Fianna Fáil, said in a statement that the Irish government's position was clear in relation to the Corrib gas situation, that the negotiating is over and "that is it". In relation to the policing of the protests, he and the opposition's Enda Kenny, leader of Fine Gael, reiterated that "the law must be obeyed". A further large scale protest at Bellanaboy scheduled for 24 November was cancelled by the protesters for fear of further serious injuries from Gardaí.

=== 2007 ===
On 5 June, five protesters chained themselves together outside the Bord na Móna facility near Bangor Erris where Shell have been dumping the peat removed from Bellinaboy. On 12 September, a protester charged with public order offences had her case dismissed in Belmullet because of conflicting Garda evidence. The judge dismissed most of the charges and sentenced the five protesters from June to community service for threatening and abusive behaviour. The judge disclosed that she had received "hate mail".

=== 2008 ===
In April 2008, a new group was set up by people formerly active in S2S. Pobal Chill Chomáin proposed moving the refinery to Glinsk, which would have removed the necessity to transport the gas near people's homes and under roads. The proposal was rejected by both Shell and the government. In 2008, a new security firm, Integrated Risk Management Services, was brought in to defend Shell's preparations for the landfall of the raw gas pipeline. In August, S2S began training for marine protests in anticipation of the arrival of the Allseas pipe-laying ship Solitaire, the biggest of its kind in the world, with a collection of small boats.

In the meantime, a local Porturlin fisherman, Pat O'Donnell, laid 800 crab pots along the intended path of Solitaire, and defended them from Shell survey boats which attempted to remove them. The Department of Agriculture, Fisheries and Food said that as both parties had licenses for their activities, they would have to sort it out between themselves. Two Irish Navy ships arrived in Broadhaven Bay to assist the Garda Water Unit in dealing with the protests. Solitaire was boarded by S2S activists in Killybegs. Not long after it arrived on Mayo's coast, the ship's company said it had suffered damage to its crane. It returned to Britain for repairs. Maura Harrington began a hunger strike to coincide with the arrival of Solitaire, the Allseas pipe-laying vessel, in Broadhaven Bay. Harrington, who had recently retired as principal of Inver Primary School in, continued her protest until the ship left Irish waters.

=== 2009 ===
In March 2009, Harrington was sentenced to a month in Mountjoy Prison, for assaulting a Garda at McGrath's pier. In July 2009, Niall Harnett and Harrington, two leading Corrib gas activists, were jailed for four months over demonstrations.

In November 2009, the Garda Ombudsman Commission recommended that disciplinary action be taken against a senior member of the Garda Síochána over the handling of the June 2007 protest. In a separate development, An Bord Pleanála found that up to half of the final section of Shell's proposed route for the onshore pipeline was 'unacceptable' on safety grounds.

=== 2010 ===
Shell failed to meet An Bord Pleanala's deadline in February and applied for an extension of time to put their proposals forward as to how the project might proceed. Pat O'Donnell, from Porturlin, was sentenced to seven months imprisonment in February. In April, Niall Harnett of Kilcommon, was jailed. Little work was carried out by Shell in 2010. The film Pipe Down was a winner in the Waterford Film Festival. Brian Barrington BL in a report commissioned for Front Line Defenders found serious problems in North Mayo. On Monday 31 May 2010, Shell submitted a third revised EIS to An Bord Pleanala for a revised pipeline route.

=== 2011 ===
In April 2011, it emerged that Gardaí who had just arrested two female protestors had made explicit jokes about raping them. They had inadvertently recorded themselves making the comments on a video camera they had taken from one of the women, which they later returned with the recording on it. The comments were widely criticised. In December the Broadcasting Authority of Ireland upheld a complaint about RTÉ's television reporting of the Garda Síochána Ombudsman Commission's interim report. The report confirmed that the tape had recorded Gardaí joking about raping the women. The interim report found no evidence of a criminal offence having been committed by Gardaí and no evidence of a breach of discipline. The complaint, which was upheld said that RTÉ's report was inaccurate, lacked fairness, objectivity and impartiality and caused the woman involved undue harm and offence.

Direct actions continued to hamper construction activities throughout 2011 and 2012. In May, 30 to 35 sections of wooden bog road were removed from their positions in the Shell site at Aughoose, Mayo in a mass direct action by protestors. In June, between 400 and 500 people attended the Party Against the Pipe near the compound in Aughoose, a family friendly gathering with craft workshops, music and food to mark the tenth anniversary of resistance to Shell's activities in Erris. Direct actions continued to hamper construction activities throughout 2011, 2012, and 2013.

=== 2012 ===
Another gathering took place over the June bank holiday weekend. In July, Shell attempted to transport the tunnel boring machine from Dubin Port to Ballinaboy, but were met by many direct actions. Close to the compound, the oversize transport lorry drove off the road and remained stuck in the bog for several days. There were several arrests and assaults of protestors.

In September, Shell to Sea launched a new report on the location of Ireland's oil and gas reserves, which depicted all the areas of oil and gas exploration, oil and gas discoveries and commercial fields for the first time on a single map, as well as publishing the license holding companies' estimates of how much each was worth. The report, entitled 'Liquid Assets: Ireland's oil and gas resources and how they could be managed for the people's benefit', was launched by Paul Murphy, Socialist Party MEP (Member of the European Parliament).

=== 2013 ===
In February 2013, with Shell having revealed 2012 profits of €19.6 billion, people blocked trucks on their way to the multinational corporation's tunnelling compound at Aughoose. Campaigner Terence Conway stated, "These obscene profits announced by Shell this week come at the expense of communities and the environment where Shell operate". Campaigner Maura Harrington said, "The Government are still willing to force suffering on the people of Ireland through severe cutbacks, yet at the same time give our oil and gas away to multinational companies such as Shell, with no benefit to country. It is time for people to demand that this situation is changed."

=== 2018 ===
In 2018, Shell exited the project, selling its ownership stake to the Canada Pension Plan Investment Board and transferring operatorship to minority owner Vermilion Energy.

== Rossport Solidarity Camp ==
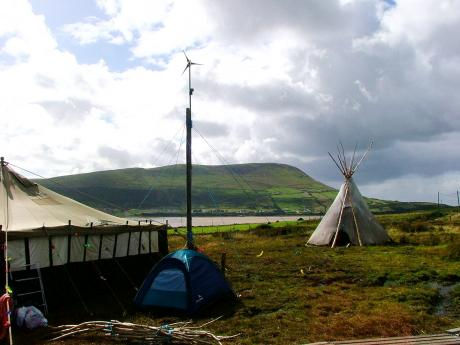
Rossport Solidarity Camp in Rossport, Ireland, February 2007

The Rossport Solidarity Camp was originally set up on 'Rossport 5' Philip McGrath's land in early July 2005. The site of the camp was on the proposed pipeline route. Set up at the request of local people who sought outside support in their campaign against the gas project, it houses national and international activists. In Spring 2006, the camp was set up again close to the beach at Glengad near the 'landfall' for Shell's proposed pipeline. Mayo County Council evicted the camp and it closed in December 2007. Since then the "camp" has been organised from the Rossport Solidarity House in Pollathomas. On Saturday 16 August 2008, the camp was set up afresh with two large tents. In August 2008, camp members picketed the Shell compound near the beach at Glengad. It organises informational weekends etc. In the same month they organised a beach party weekend to highlight the Glengad beach landfall site. In June 2009, about 40 Gardaí were stationed below the Camp to prevent activists from accessing either the beach or the sea.

== Motivation ==
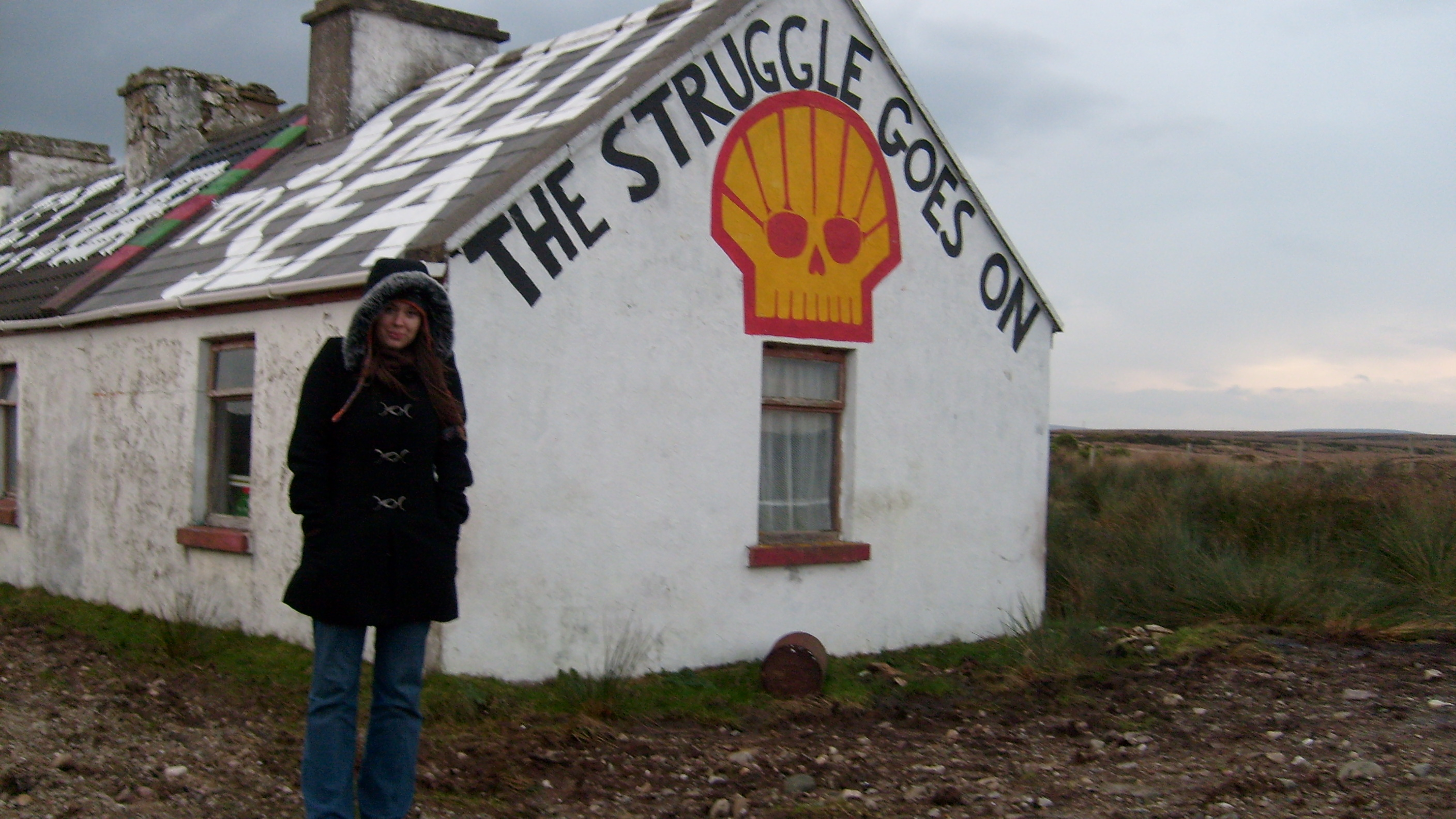
Shell to Sea mural on a gable by the Glenamoy River

The campaign has a diverse support base, including people from many political backgrounds and those with no strong politics at all. Local campaigners include former Fianna Fáil and Fine Gael supporters. Philip McGrath, one of the Rossport Five, was an election agent for Fine Gael leader Enda Kenny. Werner Blau, a physics professor at Trinity College Dublin, and part-time Rossport resident, told his neighbours that the pipeline intended for Rossport would not even comply with United States standards, which he described as "pretty lax". In its rankings of countries' facilitation of oil and gas companies, the World Bank rates Ireland in its highest, "very favourable" category, along with Pakistan and Argentina. By comparison, Nigeria is rated average. Mike Cunningham, a former director of Statoil, said: "No country in the world gives as favourable terms to the oil companies as Ireland." This is a result of legislation created by Ray Burke, who served as Minister of Communications and Energy.

Many people from outside Erris are concerned about aspects of the proposed project leading to widespread opposition. Some specific concerns are use of compulsory orders to acquire property for private companies and over-generous terms given to the oil companies by successive Fianna Fáil governments. People from the Niger Delta now resident in Ireland have expressed support. A mural of Ken Saro-Wiwa, who was executed after leading a campaign to reduce Shell's influence in Ogoniland, has been painted on a gable in Rossport and a memorial to the Ogoni Nine erected.

In 2006, Shell were accused of trying to influence local business, when the owner of a local adventure centre alleged that Shell offered him €15,000 in return for his support for the construction of the pipeline in 2005. Shell said in response, that at no point was such an offer made as it was against their business principles but that Shell had given a donation of €150 to a windsurfing festival after a request by the businessman.

== Criticism ==
Unsubstantiated allegations abound linking the IRA and Sinn Féin to the Shell to Sea campaign. In 2005, Michael McDowell—using Dáil privilege—claimed that Frank Connolly, an investigative journalist and a brother of one of the Colombia Three, had travelled to Colombia under a false passport. McDowell subsequently leaked the alleged faked passport application to a friend, the journalist Sam Smyth of the Irish Independent, and prejudiced any potential Garda investigation. Although Connolly denied McDowell's accusations, the controversy led to Irish American private donor Chuck Feeney withdrawing funding from the Centre for Public Inquiry, an investigative organisation which of which Frank Connolly was the director had published a report on the Corrib Gas Project, embarrassing the government.

Stories of infiltration by political activists from outside the area and intimidation of project supporters had also been rife, but these were denied by the independent TD Jerry Cowley and local Fine Gael TD Michael Ring. Ring originally supported S2S, though later changed his position. Gardaí also made allegations of intimidation, though no arrests were made or individuals questioned. The president of Belmullet chamber of commerce told the media that what said to be "intimidation" is actually boycotting of pro-Shell businesses by S2S supporters. He told The Irish Times: "It has never been anything more serious than that, but that is serious enough..."

== See also ==
- Corrib gas project
- Corrib gas controversy
- Rossport Five
