= Sruwaddacon Bay =

Tidal estuary in Ireland

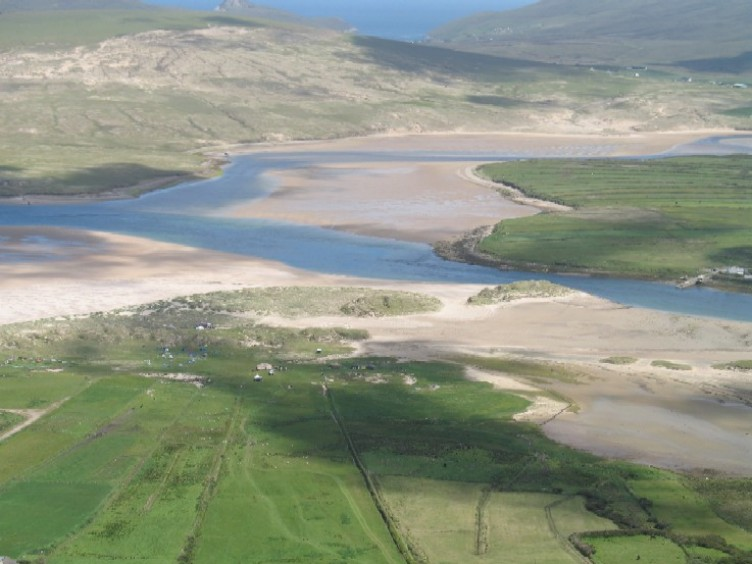
- Sruwaddacon estuary

- Location within Ireland
- Location: County Mayo
- Coordinates: 54°16′N 9°47′W
- Ocean/sea sources: Atlantic
- Basin countries: Ireland

Sruwaddacon Bay (Irish: Sruth Fada Con, meaning 'stream of the long hound') is a tidal estuary which runs through the middle of the Gaeltacht Kilcommon parish in Erris, County Mayo, Ireland. It is of historical importance in Irish legend, an important marine habitat, an E.U. Special Area of Conservation (SAC) and an EU Special Protected Area (Birds Directive). Its translated name in English, "Stream of the Long Hound", reflects its general shape. It enters the Atlantic Ocean through Broadhaven Bay, another Special Area of Conservation.

The estuary measures approximately 8.4 square kilometres and consists of a north-westerly-orientated main channel fed by the Glenamoy and Muingnabo rivers. A second channel flows around the village of Rossport from the northwest and is fed by the Gweedaney stream. Both channels join into a fast flowing channel which widens out into an exposed bay at the mouth of the estuary. The lower portion of Sruwaddacon Bay has exceptionally strong currents.

== Natural history ==
Most of the estuary is dominated by marine species with little depth in the upper and middle sections at low water and a significant intertidal area. It has few anthropogenic impacts with a mostly agricultural catchment and the small village of Rossport located at the centre of its two main channels. The outer area of the estuary is predominately sand and sand dunes where it flows into and out of Broadhaven Bay, the mid-estuary is mainly hard substrates of cobble and rock while the upper estuary has a mixture of sand and mud substrates. There are patchy areas of Fucus cover in the middle and lower areas of the estuary but the majority is unvegetated.

Salinity values recorded at beach sites were high in the middle and lower estuary – around 30 p.p.t. Salinity values close to freshwater were found at the confluence of the Glenamoy and Muingnabo rivers.

This estuary and Broadhaven Bay into which it drains, is an important breeding ground for salmon, whales and dolphins and of importance to the local fishing and recreation industries. There are extensive areas of intertidal mudflats characterised by polychaete communities and bivalves. There are Atlantic salt flats which fringe on the blanket bog, particularly in the lower reaches of the bay. Species growing here include sea thrift, sea arrowgrass, sea plantain, common salt marsh grass, Juncus gerardii, Juncus maritimus and turf fucoids.

The bay supports breeding terns of several varieties and black-headed gulls, including the red-breasted merganser and sand martin.

== In popular culture ==
The 18th-century song Liam Ó Raghallaigh is based on the drowning of a young man on his wedding day in Sruwaddacon Bay when he and friends rowed across the bay to collect the priest for his wedding and their boat sank. The song, written in the first person as spoken by his bride and widow, Neilí Nic Siúrtáin, mourns the loss, and curses the craftsmen who made the boat with cheap wood; in translation, she sings: "Your eyes are with the eels, Your mouth is with the crabs, Your two bright, clear-bright hands Are under the sharp discipline of the salmon".

== Archaeology ==
The archaeological survey carried out in 2008 for Royal Dutch Shell by the Archaeological Diving Company in Sruwaddacon Bay took some sample cores from the bay. One of their cores close to Aghoose townland turned up hazelnut shells at a depth of 10.7 metres under the bay. These have been held for analysis to be dated by the archaeological team concerned.

== Corrib gas project ==
The latest plans of the controversial Corrib gas project are to run a high pressure, raw, unodourised natural gas pipeline up the middle of this bay. Shell are planning to construct a tunnel under the bay in order to receive planning approval from An Bord Pleanála. The local community and representatives of Pobal Chill Chomáin and Shell to Sea have fought the project through the Courts, through Oral Hearings and through direct action campaigns for the last ten years as gas was first mooted to be flowing from here to Galway in 2002.

== Pictures ==
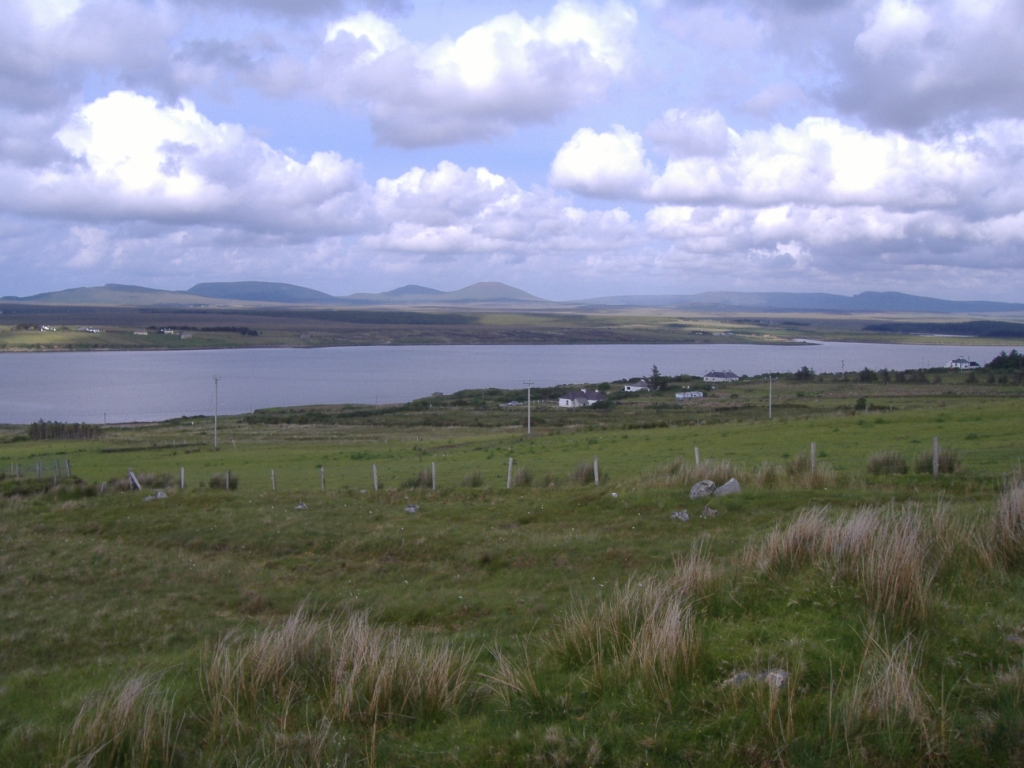
Upper reaches of estuary at Aughoose

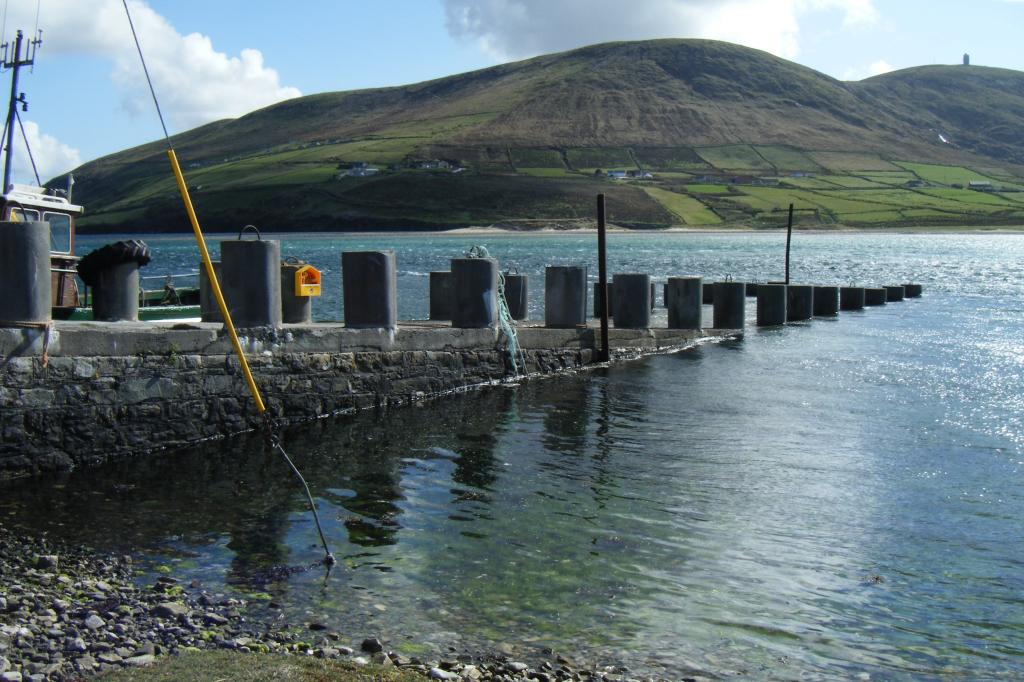
Rossport Pier

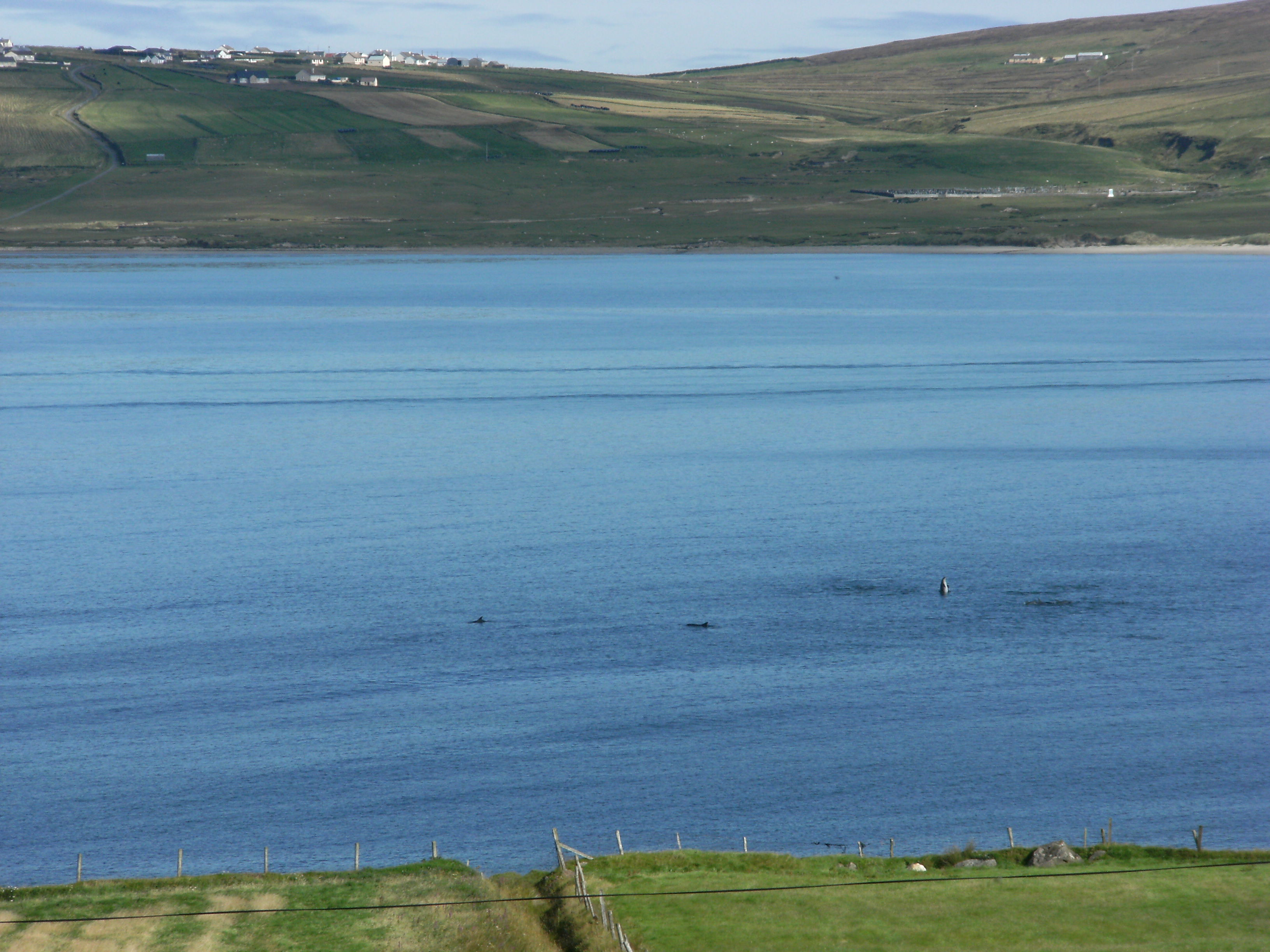
Dolphins in Sruwaddacon Estuary

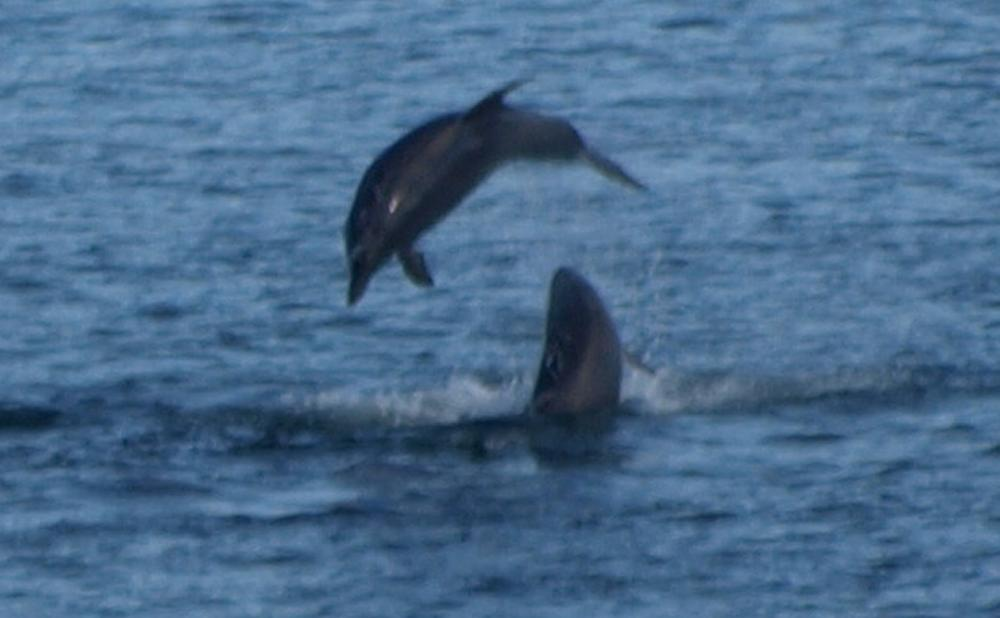
Bottlenose dolphins play in the Bay
