= Willie Corduff =

Irish environmental activist (born 1953)

- Born: 1953 (age 72–73)
- Occupation: farmer
- Awards: Goldman Environmental Prize

Willie Corduff (born 1953) is an Irish environmental activist from the farming community of Rossport, Kilcommon, Erris. Corduff's parents first arrived in Rossport in 1947, and reclaimed a farm by hand out of bogland. He became a campaigner against Royal Dutch Shell's activities in his local area when the Corrib gas controversy began. He is married to Mary and they have six children and four grandchildren.

== Beginning of activism ==
His farming existence changed with the discovery of gas eighty-three kilometres offshore, to the west of Broadhaven Bay. In 2000 the Corduffs discovered the exploitation of the gas involved the construction of a high pressure pipeline, 70 metres from their house, to a new refinery to be built in Bellanboy townland, just across the bay from his farm. They were also concerned about the proposed refinery site, its suitability and its proximity to the primary source of water for the region. Their concerns were echoed by neighbours who demanded more information.

== Rossport Five ==
In 2004 Frank Fahey, the Minister for the Marine and Natural Resources, signed a Compulsory Acquisition Order to force the raw gas pipeline through his land. Landowner Willie Corduff said that "allowing Shell to construct a pipeline would be the same as having a time-bomb in the vicinity". Corduff refused Shell access to his land and was subsequently jailed for 94 days in 2005 as one of the Rossport Five for defying a court order not to interfere with Shell's work. In 2006 he said he was "prepared to die" rather than see the pipeline cross his land.

== Shell to Sea ==
He is one of the founding members of the Shell to Sea campaign group which worked with no name since 2001 to oppose the Shell/Corrib Gas project until it adopted the name Shell to Sea in January 2005, five months prior to the jailing of five men in June of that year. Its aim is to have the gas processed at sea, get a fair and just return on Ireland's natural resources and to highlight human rights abuses alleged against Shell and the Irish state.. He has actively campaigned with them and has been arrested on numerous occasions.

== Pobal Chill Chomáin ==
He is also a founding member of Pobal Chill Chomáin, a parochial pressure group of residents in the parish of Kilcommon who split from Shell to Sea to focus solely on health and safety issues of the Shell/Corrib gas project. In June 2009 PCC members Vincent McGrath with Willie and Mary Corduff had a meeting with the Norwegian Ambassador to discuss local concerns about the project.

== Goldman Environmental Prize ==
He was awarded the European winner of the Goldman Environmental Prize in 2007 for his part in the protest campaign, which led to a halt of the construction of a pipeline through their land by Shell. He is the first Irish recipient ever of this award which is known as the "Nobel green prize" and is awarded to six people from the six continental regions every year who have taken great personal risk in the name of environmental protection.

"This year's Prize recipients have succeeded in combating some of the most important environmental challenges we face today," said Goldman Prize founder Richard N. Goldman. "Their commitment in the face of great personal risk inspires us all to think more critically about what ordinary people can do to make a difference."

== 2009 alleged assault ==
In April 2009, Shell resumed laying the offshore section of the pipeline after its environmental management plan was approved by Minister for Energy Eamon Ryan. Mr Corduff and two others climbed under a lorry at midday on Wednesday 22 April in a bid to stop work at a Glengad compound. He remained there until 4am on 23 April when he took a break. Following this, he was allegedly assaulted by several men wearing balaclavas, including being hit on the head with a baton or torch. The Registrar of Mayo General Hospital confirmed Corduff's injuries were consistent with his account of the assault, and photos obtained by Village Magazine, taken while he was in hospital and in the days after his release, show bruising on his head, face and body. Jim Farrell, a director of I-RMS, stated that he and his employees had intended to remove Corduff, but found him standing up, and had him taken away by ambulance when he complained of chest pains.

Nobel Peace Prize winner, and patron of Afri, Archbishop Desmond Tutu condemned the alleged assault and called for a national and international investigation into it.

== Featured in the media ==
Willie has featured in several recent documentaries; 'Pipe Down': Winner of the Best Feature Documentary, Waterford Film Festival and 'The Pipe' – Winner Best Feature Documentary Galway Film Festival (July) 2010.

In October 2009 he and his wife were featured in an episode of Would you believe on RTÉ television in Ireland. The documentary was entitled Living on the Edge. As it is part of a religious Affairs series Willie revealed he stopped attending church when the Bishop and the local priest blessed the gas rig and became advocates for the gas project.

== The Garda Síochána Ombudsman Commission ==
He has made a complaint, regarding an alleged assault by a Garda in April 2009, to the Garda Síochána Ombudsman Commission (GSOC).

Willie's wife Mary, who received treatment for injuries, was one of 14 people who were told in October 2007 their complaints were deemed admissible, to the GSOC, in relation to their treatment and alleged assault by Gardaí at a protest at Pollathomas pier in June 2007. The GSOC has recommended that disciplinary action be taken against a senior member of An Garda Síochána in relation to the handling of this.
