= Pobal Chill Chomáin =

Activist group in County Mayo, Ireland

Pobal Chill Chomáin (PCC, English: People of Kilcommon) is a pressure group based in the parish of Kilcommon in County Mayo, Ireland. It split from the larger Shell to Sea (in existence since 2001 as a campaign with no name; the name Shell to Sea being adopted in January 2005) campaign in April 2008. Vincent McGrath, one of the Rossport Five, is its chairman.

After its members campaigned for many years against Shell Ireland and the Irish government's actions during the Corrib gas controversy, PCC proposed that the refinery site be moved to Glinsk, a large uninhabited area a few miles to the east of the intended pipeline route and refinery. The proposal was publicly backed by Labour Party president Michael D. Higgins, Bishop of Killala Dr. John Fleming, and local Fine Gael Teachta Dála Michael Ring but rejected by Shell and the government.

PCC submitted an application to the European Commission seeking an injunction suspending State consents for the Mayo gas project. The Organisation for Economic Co-operation and Development (OECD) deemed a PCC complaint about the three oil companies involved admissible (for breaching their guidelines for multinationals), and offered to mediate between the two sides. After the failure of a forum with a limited remit, Shell and the government agreed to talks without preconditions in March 2009. PCC members have reported being under surveillance by the Garda Síochána.

In March 2009, PCC and S2S members removed a net erected by Shell sub-contractors Belcross from Glengad beach. The net was intended to prevent sand martins nesting in the dunes by the beach. On 23 April 2009, Willie Corduff, a PCC member, was hospitalised in the early hours of the morning after an alleged assault by security staff during a protest at Shell works at Glengad.

In June 2009, PCC members Vincent McGrath with Willie and Mary Corduff had a meeting with the Norwegian ambassador to discuss local concerns about the project.

In an effort to resolve issues, the OECD hosted talks between Pobal Chill Chomáin and Shell EP Ireland, mainly centred on a complaint by Pobal Chill Chomáin that the project violates OECD guidelines for multinational companies. This found that Shell had shown a willingness to address health and safety concerns but that dialogue with local stakeholders during the early stages of the project failed to meet the ‘spirit’ of OECD guidelines. Pobal Chill Chomáin were disappointed with the outcome and believe that OECD representatives should have visited the area and contended that an investigation on the ground would have provided an opportunity "to value the statements on stakeholder consultation made and to assess the reliability of Peter Cassells’s findings regarding the views of the community in relation to the project".

In the aftermath of the June 2012 magnitude 4 earthquake off the Mayo coast, PCC called on the Department of Communications, Energy and Natural Resources to conduct an immediate independent safety evaluation of the Corrib gas project infrastructure.
