= Integrated Risk Management Services =

- Company type: Limited company
- Industry: Security services
- Founded: September 2004
- Headquarters: Naas, County Kildare, Ireland
- Key people: Terry Downes (chief executive officer), Jim Farrell (Director), Martin O'Brien (Director), John Gillespie (Director) Grainne Farrell (Director)
- Products: Security solutions and consultancy
- Website: i-rms.com

Integrated Risk Management Services (I-RMS) is the trading name of Business Mobile Security Services Ltd, a private security company based in Naas, Ireland. It is a member of the Senaca Group. I-RMS are licensed by the Private Security Authority, the statutory body responsible for licensing and regulation of the private security industry in Ireland. It is also a member of the Transported Asset Protection Association. The firm's founding members, Terry Downes and Jim Farrell, have both previously served with the elite Irish Army Ranger Wing special forces unit.

== Services ==
I-RMS provide the following services:

- Corporate: business risk consultancy, logistics security, surveillance & counter surveillance
- Standard security: guarding, cash in transit, patrols, key holding
- Events services: corporate & private events, festivals & sporting occasions, security personnel, Mobile ATMs
- Special services: security consultancy, courier services, international security project management

== Affiliates ==
I-RMS has a subsidiary, I-RMS Africa Ltd., based in Nairobi, Kenya. This subsidiary formed a joint venture, KK Lodgit, with KK Security, one of Africa's largest security companies in 2008 which was sold to KK Security in December 2010.

=== Corrib Gas Project ===
I-RMS works closely with the Garda Síochána to provide security for the various sites surrounding the landfall of the Corrib gas project pipeline at Glengad beach in Erris, County Mayo where protesters who are opposed to the project have sought to disrupt work (see Corrib gas controversy).

Complaints have been made to the Private Security Authority that all 156 I-RMS employees working on the project do not wear correct identification. No formal action was taken, though the PSA has confirmed it was "working with" the company to ensure staff wore identification, commenting that it was the most monitored private security company in Ireland.

Many employees, including Team Leader Michael Dwyer, worked for the company without the appropriate PSA licence.

IRMS have been accused of involvement in a serious assault on Willie Corduff on 23 April 2009. It denied involvement but human rights group Front Line Defenders questioned IRMS' account of the incident, stating: "IRMS also stated to this author that Mr. Corduff was not assaulted, that he simply sat down and that not a finger was laid upon him. This author concludes that, in fact, he was set upon and kicked. Mr Corduff's medical records diagnose him as having bruises from kicking. The suggestion that he simply sat down also appears to have been contradicted by Shell's own briefing to The Irish Times, as well as by protester witnesses. Superintendent Michael Larkin of Belmullet Garda station stated publicly that Mr. Corduff 'was escorted from the site and spoke to Gardaí and it was decided in the best interests that he be transferred to a hospital that that he complained of feeling unwell.' This was clearly misleading. He was not 'escorted from the site.' He was taken away by ambulance on a spinal board and cervical collar on a stretcher."

IRMS was also accused of involvement in the sinking of the fishing boat of prominent protester Pat O'Donnell, the Iona Isle, on 11 June 2009. It again denied involvement. Later that summer IRMS workers posted a video of an altercation between them and O'Donnell on YouTube in which they are heard insulting him.

=== Michael Dwyer ===
I-RMS attracted considerable media attention following the revelation that a former employee, Michael Dwyer, shot dead by Bolivian police in April 2009, had worked for the firm as a team leader on the Shell Corrib project. Dwyer had travelled to Bolivia with four other former I-RMS employees, supposedly to join a bodyguard training course, but ended up in the armed entourage of Eduardo Rózsa-Flores, who was also shot dead by police. Rózsa-Flores was suspected of attempting to subvert the government of Evo Morales. According to La Prensa, the people who travelled with Dwyer on 17 November 2008 were (Tibor) Revesz, (Gabor) Dudog and (Ivan) Pistovcak. The media has speculated that the link between Dwyer and Rózsa-Flores was former I-RMS employee Tibor Revesz. Revesz is also a founding member of the Szekler Legion, a far right paramilitary group that wants autonomy for Hungarians living in Romania. An unsigned posting on the Szekler Legion website last October called for people to send their CVs to a stated email address if they believed they could assist an unnamed man – now believed to be Flores – in the protection of his "homeland" Santa Cruz. Dwyer also befriended another Legion member in Ireland, Előd Tóásó, who was arrested in the same incident that saw Dwyer killed. The company confirmed that two of those who travelled with Dwyer resigned in late May 2009.
