= Michael Martin Dwyer =

Irish security guard and paramilitary (1984-2009)

- Born: 15 June 1984; County Tipperary, Ireland
- Died: 16 April 2009 (aged 24); Viru Viru International Airport, Santa Cruz de la Sierra, Bolivia

Michael Dwyer (15 June 1984 – 16 April 2009) was an Irish security guard and paramilitary, shot dead in 2009 by the Bolivian Police Special Forces in the Las Americas Hotel, Santa Cruz de la Sierra, Bolivia in disputed circumstances.

== Background ==
Dwyer graduated with a BSc in Construction Management from the Galway-Mayo Institute of Technology in 2008. From February to late October he was a Team Leader for the security firm Integrated Risk Management Services (I-RMS) at the controversial Shell gas pipeline site in Rossport, County Mayo, despite not holding the required Static Security license. It was there Dwyer reportedly met Tibor Révész and Előd Tóásó.

== Bolivia ==
In November 2008 he travelled to Bolivia from Madrid with three former I-RMS employees. According to La Prensa, the people who travelled with Dwyer on 17 November 2008 were Tibor Révész, Gábor Dudog and Ivan Pistovcak.

In Santa Cruz he joined Eduardo Rózsa-Flores. The media has speculated that the link between Dwyer and Rózsa-Flores was former I-RMS employee Tibor Révész. Revesz is a founding member of the Szekler Legion, a paramilitary group that wants autonomy for Hungarians in Romania. An unsigned posting on the Szekler Legion website in October 2008 called for people to send their CVs to a stated email address if they believed they could assist an unnamed man – now believed to be Flores – in the protection of his "homeland", Santa Cruz. According to family and friends, Dwyer had traveled to Bolivia to attend a bodyguard course but no evidence for such a course exists.

== Death in Bolivia ==
Following a bombing on 15 April at the home of Julio Cardinal Terrazas, the following day at around 4:00 a.m. thirty members of an elite police squad entered the hotel, cut the phone line, and demanded that night staff tell them where Flores and his entourage were staying. They were the only guests on the fourth floor, in a row of five rooms. Staff members on duty reported an explosion that shook the building, followed by 10 to 15 minutes of intense gunfire, "a rain of bullets" in the words of the night manager. Dwyer was killed, along with Árpád Magyarosi and Rózsa-Flores. The two members of the group not killed, Mario Tadic and Előd Tóásó, were taken prisoner, however their trial was troubled by the resignation of the prosecutor in charge, upon the emergence of evidence linking him to the planting of false evidence.

According to a police report he had two guns and several rounds of ammunition in his room and gunpowder residue on his hands, however this conflicted with another police report that there had been no crossfire. Ballistics reports show that two shots were fired from his room.

== Autopsies ==
An Irish state pathologist, Marie Cassidy, told the inquest into his death that Dwyer died from a single shot to the heart and not from six shots to the chest as asserted by the Bolivian autopsy. She said the post mortem on Dwyer in Bolivia was incomplete.

The Bolivian autopsy by Antonio Torres Bulanza and Rafael Vargas Peña, of the Instituto de Investigaciones Forenses, showed Dwyer had six bullet entrance wounds with three exit wounds and the trajectory was from the back to the front, slightly from below to above, that his heart was intact and the cause of death was hypovolaemic shock (acute blood loss) from multiple thoracic injuries by bullets.

== Inquiry demand by Dwyer's family ==
The Dwyer family and the Irish Minister for Foreign Affairs have demanded an independent international inquiry. They base their demand on photos they received showing Dwyer at an airport after he was supposed to have been killed, the claims of the former chief prosecutor who claims that Dwyer was unarmed when killed, that there was no evidence of a firefight, and that there was no evidence that Dwyer was knowingly involved in any assassination plot, and the claims of Elod Toaso that Dwyer survived the raid and that he was likely summarily executed at Viru Viru Airport.

== Trial of survivors ==
In August 2013, Toaso and Tadic went on trial on charges of terrorism, along with 37 other suspects. During the trial, both testified that Dwyer was still alive after the raid had ended. Toaso testified that after the raid he was taken to Viru Viru airport, where he recognised Mr Dwyer from a tattoo on his arm and that he was wearing red boxer shorts. Tadic testified that he had heard somebody speaking in English, and that Dwyer was the only member of the group who spoke English.
