= Half-graben =

Geological structure bounded by a fault along one side of its boundaries

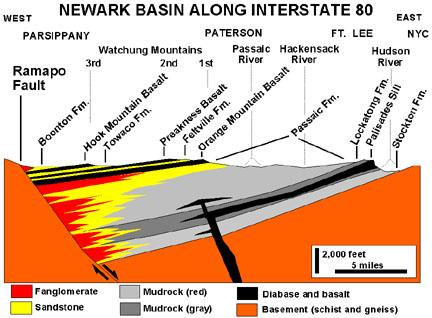
The Newark Basin, an early Mesozoic half-graben

A half-graben is a geological structure bounded by a fault along one side of its boundaries, unlike a full graben where a depressed block of land is bordered by parallel faults.

== Rift and fault structure ==
Rift extension. Top: Full graben between two faults, each sloping towards center of rift. Bottom: half graben, more common

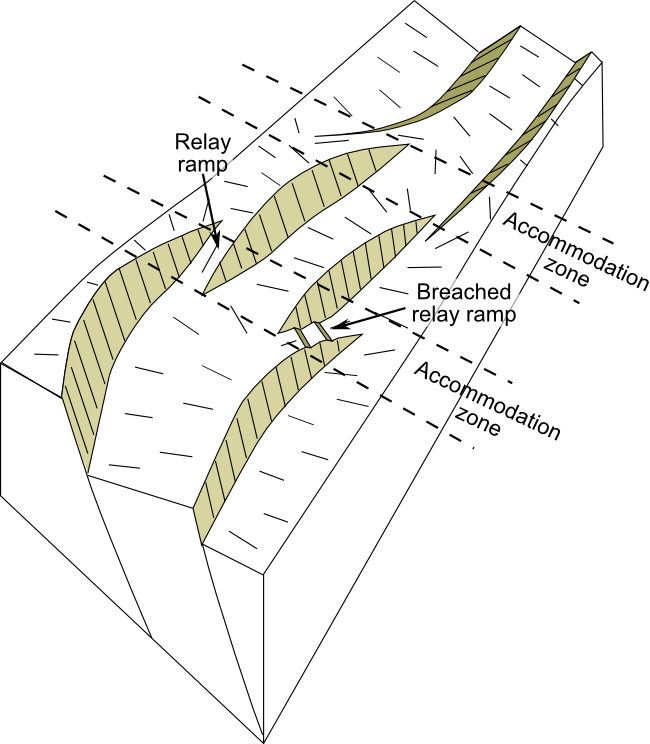
Block view of a rift formed of three segments, showing the location of the accommodation zones between them at changes in fault location or polarity (dip direction)

A rift is a region where the lithosphere extends as two parts of the Earth's crust pull apart. Often a rift will form in an area of the crust that is already weakened by earlier geological activity. Extensional faults form parallel to the axis of the rift. An extensional fault may be seen as a crack in the crust that extends down at an angle to the vertical. As the two sides pull apart, the hanging wall ("hanging over" the sloping fault) will move downward relative to the footwall. A rift basin is created as the crust thins and sinks. In the rift basin, warm mantle material wells up, melting the crust and frequently triggering the eruption of volcanoes.

Extensional basins may appear to be caused by a graben, or depressed block of land, sinking between parallel normal faults that dip towards the center of the graben from both sides. In fact, they are usually made of linked asymmetrical half-grabens. Faults with antithetic slope directions linked in to a controlling fault, or periodic changes of dip in the controlling faults, give the impression of full graben symmetry.

As the rift expands, the rift flanks lift up due to isostatic compensation of the lithosphere. This creates the asymmetric topographic profile that is typical of half grabens. The half grabens may have alternating polarities along the rift axis, dividing the rift valley into segments.

Intracontinental and marine rift basins such as the Gulf of Suez, East African Rift, Rio Grande rift system and the North Sea often contain a series of half-graben sub-basins, with the polarity of the dominant fault system changing along the axis of the rift. Often the extensional fault systems are segmented in these rifts. Rift border faults with lengths over 10 kilometres (6.2 mi) are separated by relay ramp structures. The relay ramps may provide pathways for sediment to be carried into the basin. Typically the rift is broken along its axis into segments about 50 to 150 kilometres (31 to 93 mi) long.

== Sedimentation ==
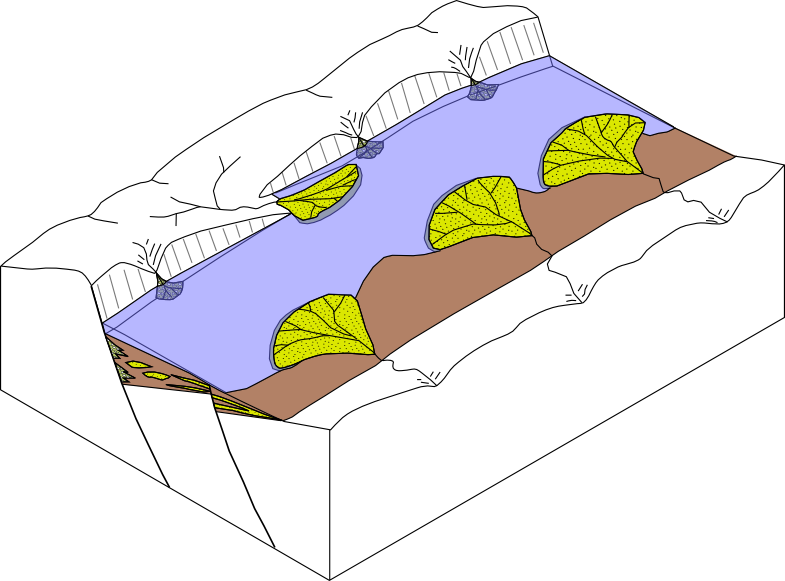
Lake-filled half-graben showing sedimentation dominantly from the 'hinge' margin

Four zones of sedimentation can be defined in a half-graben. The first is "escarpment margin" sedimentation, found along the major border faults bounding the half graben, where the deepest part of the basin meets the highest rift-shoulder mountains. Comparatively little sediment enters the half-graben across the major bounding fault, since uplift of the footwall causes the land on the footwall side to slope away from the fault. Rivers on that side therefore carry sediment away from the rift valley. But as the lowest part of the basin with the greatest rate of subsidence, the escarpment margin experiences the highest rates of sedimentation, which may accumulate to several kilometers in depth. This sedimentation often includes very coarse debris such as huge blocks from rock falls, as well as fans of sediment from the basin wall. Other material is transported across or along the basin to the deep water parts of a rift lake along the escarpment margin.

Most of the sediment will enter the half-graben along the unfaulted hanging wall side. On the side of the basin opposite the main border fault, sedimentation occurs along the "hinged margin", which may also be called the "shoaling margin" or the "flexural margin". In this part of the basin, slopes are usually gentle and large river systems may carry sediment into the basin, which could be stored in deltas where they enter a rift valley lake. Littoral and sub-littoral carbonate deposits may accumulate in these conditions. The "axial margins" at the ends of basins often include low-gradient ramps where major rivers enter the basin, building deltas and form currents within a rift lake that can carry sediment from one end to the other. Between adjacent half grabens there will be "accommodation zones" that may include local extension, compression or strike-slip faulting. These can create complex morphologies within which different mechanisms affect sedimentation. The types of sedimentation in half grabens also depend on lake levels in the rift, the climate (e.g. tropical versus temperate) in which the sediments form and the water chemistry.

Although sediments arrive primarily from the unfaulted side of the half-graben, some erosion takes place on the fault escarpment of the main border fault, and this produces characteristic alluvial fans where confined channels emerge from the escarpment.

Lake Baikal is an unusually large and deep example of half-graben evolution. The lake is 630 by 80 kilometres (391 by 50 mi), with a maximum depth of 1,700 metres (5,600 ft). Sediment in the depression may be up to 6,000 metres (20,000 ft) in depth. The system also includes some small Quaternary volcanoes. In this lake, at first a series of half-grabens were linked in a linear chain. As the rift valley aged, extensive deformation developed on both sides of the lake, converting them into asymmetric full grabens.

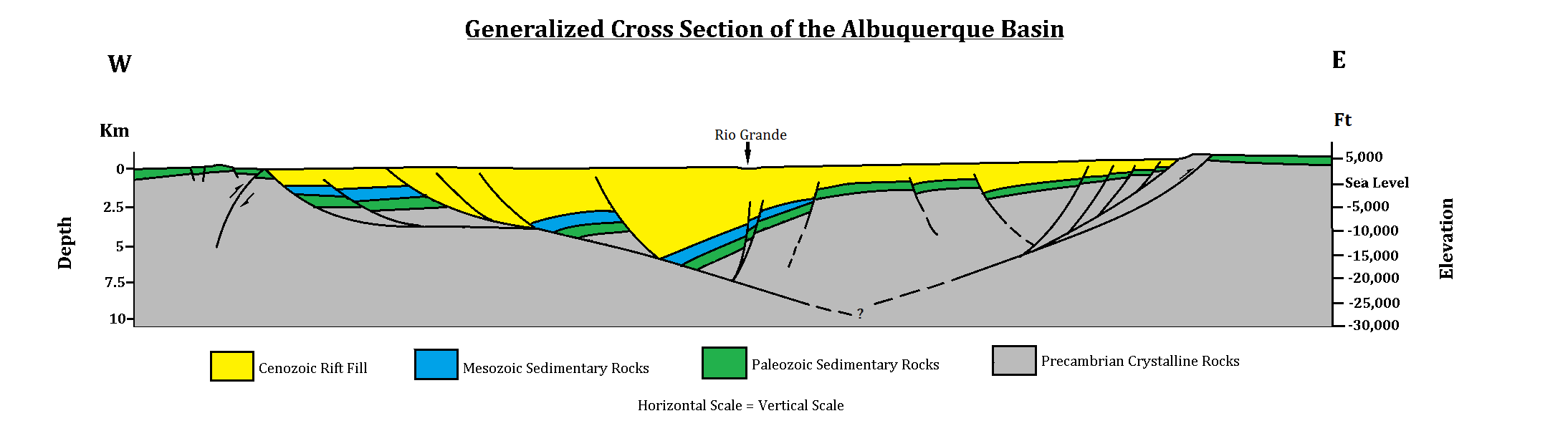
A generalized cross section of the Albuquerque Basin from east to west. Note the half-graben geometry, Paleozoic and Mesozoic sediments that existed pre-rift, and the large (up to 28%) amount of extension.

== Examples of half-grabens ==
Graben	Fault	Age	Location	Sources
Albuquerque Basin		middle Miocene and early Pliocene	United States	
Cheshire Basin	Red Rock Fault	Late Palaeozoic and Mesozoic	England	
Ellisras Basin	Melinda Fault Zone	Permian	South Africa	
Erris Trough	Erris Ridge	Permian to Triassic and middle Jurassic	Ireland	
Lake Baikal		Cenozoic	Russia	
Newark Basin		Early Mesozoic	United States	
Pannonian Basin			Hungary	
Saint Lawrence rift system			Canada	
South Georgia rift		Triassic to Jurassic	United States	
Slyne Trough		Triassic and Middle Jurassic	Ireland	
Taipei Basin			Taiwan	
Vale of Clwyd	Vale of Clwyd Fault	Permian and Triassic	Wales	
Widmerpool Gulf	Hoton Fault	Early Carboniferous	England	
Limagne graben	Limagne fault	middle Eocene–early Miocene	France	
