= Graham Hearne =

British solicitor and finance director (born 1937)

- Born: 23 November 1937 (age 88)
- Occupations: solicitor and finance director

Sir Graham James Hearne CBE (born 23 November 1937) is a British solicitor and finance director who was chairman of Enterprise Oil from 1991 until 2002, having joined Enterprise as chief executive officer in 1984.

== Career ==
He practiced as a solicitor at Pinsent & Co., now Pinsent Masons, and at Fried, Frank, Harris, Shriver & Jacobson in New York City, during 1963-66.

He joined the executive of the Industrial Reorganisation Congress in 1967, before moving on to N M Rothschild & Sons merchant bankers, in 1970, where he remained a non-executive director until June 2010.

In 1977, he began a four-year term as director of finance at textile company Courtaulds.

Hearne became CEO of Tricentrol P.L.C. in 1981. Disagreements with its board of directors resulted in his 1983 resignation, at which time he joined a smaller oil company, Carless, Capel & Leonard, now Haltermann Carless, in London.

He was appointed the first CEO of the newly formed Enterprise Oil, when it was spun-out from the former state-owned British Gas in December 1983, assuming the role the following March. Before the company was acquired by Shell in 2002; Hearne became known as "the driving force behind Enterprise", leading the fledgling company as it scaled daily oil production. There, future Archbishop of Canterbury Justin Welby also served, as the treasurer of its oil exploitation group.

He was High Sheriff of Greater London in 1995-96. He was awarded the CBE in 1990, and knighted in 1998.

In 2002, he became the chair of Consort Resources, founded by Lord Colin Moynihan in 2000.

He was a non-executive director at Rothschilds, Novar and Invensys.
