= Rossport =

Village in County Mayo, Ireland

Ros Dumhach Rosdoagh / Rossport
- Village
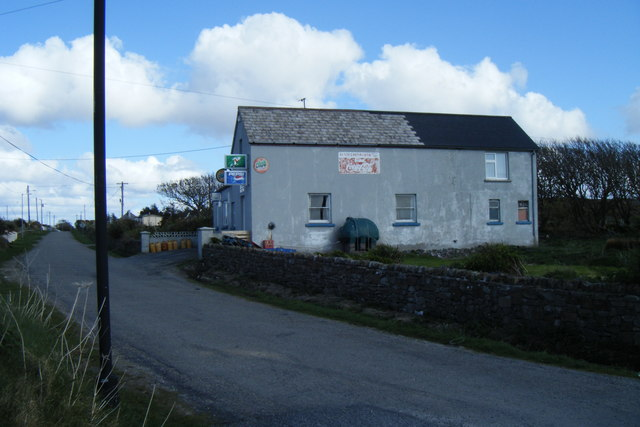
- Rossport village shop & bar

- Location in Ireland
- Coordinates: 54°16′54″N 9°47′59″W
- Country: Ireland
- Province: Connacht
- County: County Mayo
- Elevation: 60 m (200 ft)
- Irish Grid Reference: F828384
- Ros Dumhach is the only official name. The anglicised spelling Rosdoagh and English name Rossport have no official status.

Rossport (Irish: Ros Dumhach), also known as Rosdoagh, is a Gaeltacht village and townland in northwest County Mayo, Ireland. It is within the barony of Erris and parish of Kilcommon. It lies close to the mouth of Broadhaven Bay on the headland where the confluence of three rivers meet (the Muingnabo, the Glenamoy and the Gweedaney) flowing into Sruth Fada Conn Bay. Its area is 1,446 acres (5.85 km^{2}).

== History ==
In 1636 the Barrett clan owned Rossport.

=== Bournes ===
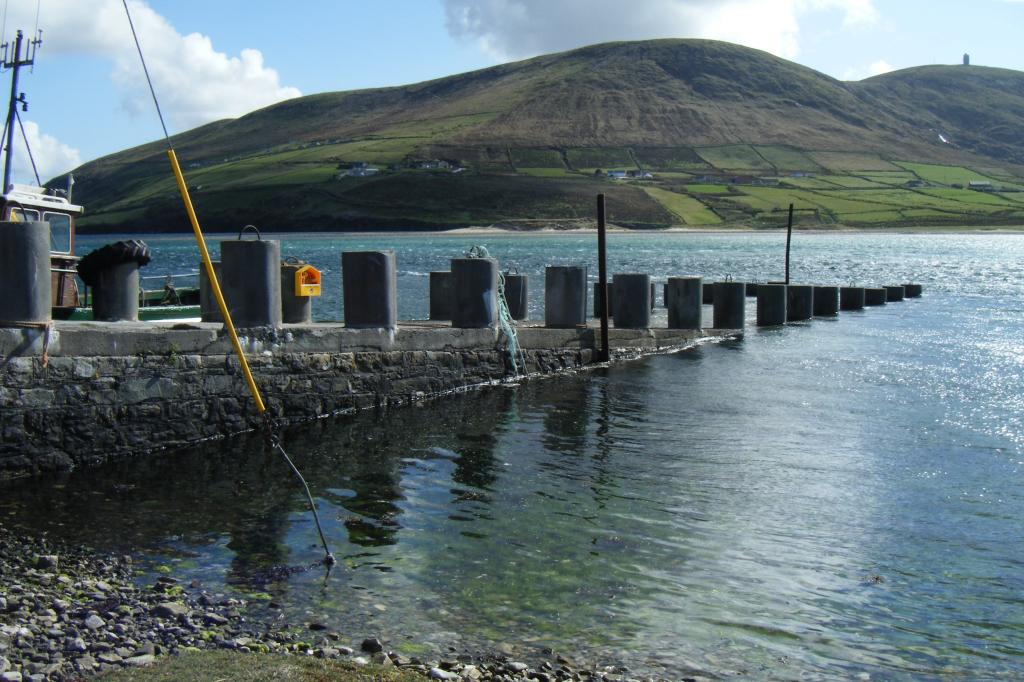
The pier at Rossport County Mayo. June 2008

About the year 1707, Thomas Bournes, a Cromwellian from County Sligo was granted Rossport and neighbouring Muingnabo from Arthur Shaen. In 1727 he transferred his interest in Rossport to his brother George, who settled in the townland in 1756. Two other branches of the Bournes family had settled in Stonefield and Portacloy, two townlands on the Dún Chaocháin peninsula. The old Protestant graveyard well-hidden on the hillside above the village bears testament to the Protestant past of the townland. Like other landlords, the Bournes had tenants. While some landlords treated their tenants despicably, it would appear from reports that the Bournes treated their tenants with some compassion. Another George Bournes, probably a great-grandson of the original man referred to previously, is reported to have written to the Protestant Bishop of Killala requesting relief for the starving tenants. The bishop got several tons of meal and potatoes and George received some of it for his tenants.

Samuel Bournes inherited Rossport from his father George and in 1832 he cleared tenant farmers off the southern end of the townland to build a substantial and commodious two-storey house with suitable offices and walled garden. He availed of the Land Loan Scheme to improve his estate – in 1849 he received £600 and in 1859, a further £300.

The Bournes estate provided some of its tenants with other employment in the form of an industrial school which taught knitting and sewing. During the famine of 1845 – 47 the Society of Friends (Quakers) sent food relief to tenants of the Bournes in Rossport.

There was a huge population of landless people who were close to destitution who were not Bournes tenants and the Bournes felt threatened 'For although the people are now perfectly quiet still, their destitution may force them to destroy the lives and properties of others (from Outrage papers 1846). Samuel Bournes requested that there be police brought to Rossport to quell any trouble. By 1866 there was a police barracks based in a small thatched cottage in the village.

By 1881 the Bournes family had moved back to London. During 'the Troubles' the barracks was burned and the police moved into the old Bournes dwelling where they remained until they left the district in about 1959. In 1959 it was made into a Gael Linn college, the predecessor of the current (secondary school) Colaiste Chomain in the middle of the village to which it moved in 1968. The old police barracks is still there in a field overlooking Sruth Fada Conn Bay.

Mrs. Bournes distributed clothing among the poor which she received from the Ladies Irish Clothing Society. The Bournes distributed porridge and soup from their dwelling on a daily basis. A large bell was rung when the food was ready for distribution. The Bournes also set up a school, which like all schools was used for proselytising but unlike most, the teacher taught in the Irish language, the main role being to educate rather than to turn people into Protestants.

=== Proposed bridge ===
Around the turn of the 20th century, the government contemplated the erection of a bridge across Sruth Fada Conn Bay from Rossport to Glengad. The current in this bay is extremely strong and it was difficult to negotiate by boat. In 1900 the secretary of the Congested Districts Board wrote:

"The possible sites for a bridge are two:-

- for a wooden bridge just under Rossport House, cost £1,000
- for a suspension bridge a little below the present ferry, cost perhaps £700.

These are rough estimates and include the cost of approaches"

Nothing much happened and in 1914 Fr. Timlin became parish priest of the area. He tried to urge the government to build the bridge but unfortunately it coincided with the beginning of World War I and the Government, having other things on its mind, shelved the project.

=== Robert Buchanan ===
Robert Buchanan, a Scotsman, left his medical studies in Britain and came to Rossport Lodge in 1874. He was an amateur doctor, and he and his wife tended the sick of the townland. They showed great tenderness towards all the sick and afflicted. He and his wife fed half the starving villagers, and they were generous to the Buchanans in return. He was also a poet. When the Buchanans' dog died the villagers of Rossport came to offer their condolences and sympathy. A song of mockery called 'Madadh Buchanan' was composed by a Glengad man ridiculing the Rossport people for mourning Buchanan's dog.

=== Allan Sutherland ===
In 1893 an Englishman arrived in Rossport. He appeared to be wealthy and told people he was Allan Sutherland, Captain of the Argyll Highlanders and the 5th Lancers. He had an entourage of servants and workers with him – game keepers, dogs, guns, meat, fish, whiskey, wine and fishing tackle. When he went into Belmullet the shopkeepers all gave him credit so delighted with their distinguished guest as they were. Mr. Allan Sutherland borrowed everywhere he went and paid nobody. He always seemed to have forgotten his cheque book. He bought horses locally which he kept on a trial basis but in reality he sold them to Dublin for £10 each. He lived in Rossport House even though the Bournes family in London did not want him there. He had found the property in the Field magazine but he never paid the Bournes a penny of rental. Finally the law caught up with him and he was sentenced to seven-years' penal servitude for horse stealing and other offences. He pleaded guilty to all the charges. It was disclosed in court that he had received a legacy of over £4,000 and had squandered the lot on horses and gambling.

== Rossport Five and the Corrib gas controversy ==
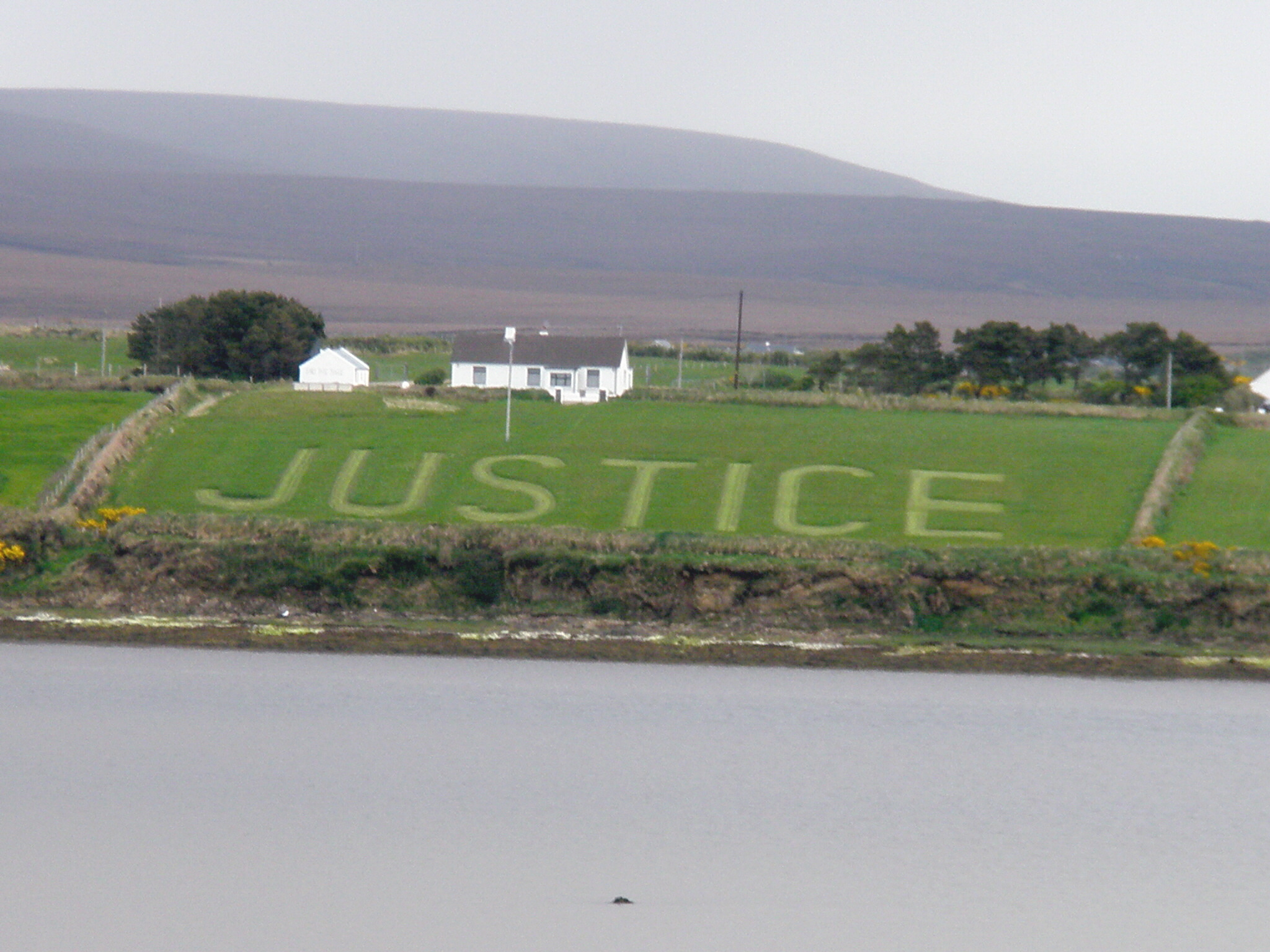
Justice mowed in a Rossport hay field

Rossport came to national prominence in 2005 when five local men were jailed for refusing to allow Royal Dutch Shell access to their lands. Shell, with the assistance of the Irish government, propose to lay a high pressure, unodourised raw gas pipeline straight from the Corrib gas field through the village. The An Bord Pleanala Oral hearing held in the summer of 2009 in the Broadhaven Bay Hotel in Belmullet was attended daily by many Rossport residents has declared this route unacceptable on safety grounds. Shell drew up proposals to bring the pipeline up Sruth Fada Conn Bay which they presented to An Bord Pleanala in May 2010. On 31 May, An Bord Pleanala received a new Environmental impact statement 2010

In 2007, Rossport native Willie Corduff won the Goldman Environmental Prize for his opposition to the Corrib Gas Project.

In 2011, Risteard O'Domhnaill's documentary film The Pipe was premiered in the Green Film festival in Leicester, UK.

== See also ==
- List of towns and villages in Ireland
