= Slyne-Erris Basin =

The Slyne-Erris Basin or Slyne-Erris Trough' is a geological basin off the west coast of Donegal, Ireland.

In recent years it has been shown to be prospective for hydrocarbons, hosting Royal Dutch Shell Corrib gas field (discovered by Enterprise Oil, bought by Shell), and several other prospects being evaluated by a number of other oil companies.

Structurally, the basin is a series of NNE-SSW trending half-grabens.

== The Slyne Basin ==
The Slyne Basin or Slyne Trough consists of three sub-basins, the Northern, Central and Southern Slyne Basins. The Northern and Central Slyne Basins are half-grabens of opposite polarity with the switch occurring across the Central Slyne Transfer, interpreted to be a splay of the Great Glen Fault. The Corrib Field is situated in the Northern Slyne Basin.

In the Central Slyne the 27/5-1 well proved the presence of Late Permian evaporites including salt, possibly indicating fault activity at this time. The basin is interpreted to have been active particularly during the Triassic and Middle Jurassic periods.

The Slyne Basin links the Erris and Porcupine Basins.

== The Erris Basin ==
The Erris Basin or Erris Trough is a half-graben that runs parallel with the Rockall Basin and is separated from it by a horst structure, the Erris Ridge. It is interpreted to have been active particularly during the Permian to Triassic and Middle Jurassic periods.
