= Ogoni Nine =

Group of nine Nigerian activists executed by hanging in 1995

The Ogoni Nine were a group of nine activists from the Ogoni region of Nigeria who opposed the operating practices of the Royal Dutch Shell oil corporation in the Niger Delta region. The military government in Nigeria was threatened by their work and arrested them for murders of four Ogoni chiefs. Social activist and head of the group named Movement for the Survival of the Ogoni People (MOSOP), Ken Saro-Wiwa, alongside eight of his fellow leaders—Saturday Dobee, Nordu Eawo, Daniel Gbooko, Paul Levera, Felix Nuate, Baribor Bera, Barinem Kiobel, and John Kpuine—were put on trial under the false pretext that the group had incited the murder of four Ogoni chiefs. They were hanged on 10 November 1995 and buried in Port Harcourt Cemetery.

Ken Saro-Wiwa had previously been a critic of the Royal Dutch Shell oil corporation, and had been imprisoned for a year. According to Amnesty International, "in May of 1994, [the] Ogoni chiefs known to be opponents of MOSOP were murdered. Without presenting any evidence, the government blamed MOSOP and arrested..people, including Ken Saro-Wiwa and Barinem Kiobel. Kiobel...had a senior government position and had been critical of the military's actions in Ogoniland." The executions provoked international condemnation and led to the increasing treatment of Nigeria as a pariah state until the death of military head of state Sani Abacha in 1998.

The testimony of at least two witnesses against Saro-Wiwa concerning the Ogoni elder murders was later retracted. These witnesses alleged they had been paid and offered jobs by Shell, in the presence of their lawyer, to give false evidence.

== Background ==
Starting in 1938, Royal Dutch Shell started relations with the Nigerian government, and the first oil was extracted in 1958. For several years after, the Nigerian government became closer with Shell, and in 1979 The Shell Petroleum Development Company of Nigeria was established. The first documented oil spill occurred in 1970 in Nigeria within the Boobanabe community.

Over the years, while Shell had been extracting oil in Nigeria, there were several spills that have yet to be cleaned up. This upset Nigerian citizens, who wanted their government to put pressures on Shell to clean up the spills. Specifically, the Ogoni people were concerned about the environmental degradation. Ken Saro-Wiwa, responding to the Ogoni's concerns, founded the Movement for the Survival of the Ogoni People (MOSOP), which brought together more than 700,000 Ogoni people to advocate for social, economic, and environmental justice using nonviolent methods, including protests. Ogoniland, the name of the traditional homeland of the Ogoni people, was devastated by oil spills. These oil spills made the land uninhabitable in some areas, and unable to be farmed, a common livelihood of the Ogoni people.

=== Ogoni Bill of Rights ===
MOSOP released the Ogoni Bill of Rights in August 1990. The bill aimed to give the Ogoni people greater economic and political autonomy and to prevent further environmental degradation in Ogoniland. It also called on international governments and development institutions to show solidarity with the Ogoni people and shield activists from political persecution at the hands of Nigeria's federal government.

The Ogoni Bill of Rights was presented to the Nigerian government and the people of Nigeria in October 1990. It was also intended for the international community to read and understand. The bill was written by the MOSOP, with direct work by Ken Saro-Wiwa. In August 1990 the Chiefs and Ogoni people met to sign the bill of rights, claiming their independence from the British, while also recognizing loyalty to Nigeria. Additionally, the bill called for political control by Ogoni people over Ogoniland. One important aspect was to have Ogoni people control economic resources on their land, protect their own environment from further degradation, and include direct representation of Ogoni people in Nigerian government. The bill included that these rights should have been turned over to the Ogoni people after British rule ceased 30 years ago, but according to Ken Saro Wiwa these rights "have been misused and abused, turning Nigeria into a hell on earth for the Ogoni and similar ethnic minorities."

According to MOSOP's first president, Dr. Garrick B Leton the Ogoni people were experiencing a genocide, "by multi-national oil companies under the supervision of the Government of the Federal Republic of Nigeria. It is that of a distinct ethnic minority in Nigeria who feel so suffocated by existing political, economic and social conditions in Nigeria that they have no choice but to cry out to the international community for salvation." He explained further that 100 billion dollars of oil has been exported from Ogoniland, but all the Ogoni people saw was "no pipe-borne water, no electricity, very few roads, ill-equipped schools and hospitals and no industry whatsoever." Environmental degradation was also an essential topic in the bill, including how streams and rivers are polluted, gas flares burn constantly, and various issues with acid rain and oil spills. This in turn forced the Ogoni people to outsource and buy food, instead of farming it themselves like they once did.

The bill included a list of 20 rights presented to the government and Nigerian people, as well as an addendum and a call to action for the international community.

== MOSOP and the lead-up to the executions ==
In the early 90s there were numerous protests. MOSOP sought international cooperation, including from the United Nations (UN), led by Ken Saro-Wiwa. By 1992 the MOSOP was primarily working against the oil industry in Nigeria.

In 1993, Shell suspended production in Ogoniland for a short period of time. On 4 January 1993, 300,000 people protested peacefully against oil production in Ogoniland. During MOSOP's 1993 protest, an Ogoni leader explained, "We have woken up to find our lands devastated by agents of death called oil companies. Our atmosphere has been totally polluted, our lands degraded, our waters contaminated, our trees poisoned, so much so that our flora and fauna have virtually disappeared". This day is now recognized as Ogoni Day.

In April 1993, MOSOP leader Ken Saro-Wiwa had already been arrested twice, and the MOSOP protests were becoming violent as Shell called in government troops to put people to rest. The MOSOP continued to face increasing violence, primarily from the military during 1993 and 1994. In May 1994, four Ogoni chiefs were murdered, and the government took to arresting dozens of MOSOP members, including the Ogoni Nine.

Later that same year, Shell requested military support in order to build a pipeline through Ogoniland. The MOSOP continued to protest Shell's business in Nigeria and oppose their work. During 1993-1994, there was widespread violence, with up to 2,000 deaths in total.

== Trial ==
Starting on 21 May 1994 four Ogoni chiefs: Albert Badey, Edward Kobani, Samuel Orage and Theophilus Orage, were murdered in Gokana. R. Boele, Ogoni.

The Nigerian government arrested the Ogoni Nine, blaming them for the murders of the four Chiefs. Ken Saro-Wiwa was arrested, although Saro-Wiwa was not anywhere near the murder scene at the time. Amnesty International issued a statement that Saro-Wiwa's arrest was "part of the continuing suppression by the Nigerian authorities of the Ogoni people's campaign against the oil companies". Over the next several months Ogoni people were arrested, tortured, beaten, and villages destroyed and looted. Ken Saro-Wiwa was subjected to a three day interrogation, by state intelligence on 28 June 1994. Finally, a court hearing was scheduled on 28 June, at the High Court in Port Harcourt, however the defendants were prohibited from attending, and the hearing did not take place. On 11 July a second court hearing was scheduled, and again Saro-Wiwa and his fellow defendants were not allowed to attend. On 18 July, a third hearing was scheduled but canceled soon after.

After months in prison, a three-member Tribunal was set on 4 November 1994. It included a military officer, and on 21 November the three members were sworn in. The Attorney General stated that the tribunal would commence on 16 January, enforcing a trial date before there was evidence to show that these men were guilty in any form. On 16 January the Tribunal was postponed. On 28 January the Ogoni Nine were charged with a holding charge of the murder of the Ogoni chiefs, after 8 months in jail. An additional 18 other Ogoni members who were held in jail for a year were charged with murder as well. In June 1995 the Tribunal commenced. Eventually Ken Saro-Wiwa's lawyers pulled out of the Tribunal due to the false allegations, bribery of key prosecuting witnesses, and its flawed nature. On 30 October 1995, Saro-Wiwa and the eight other men were officially charged with the murder, and sentenced to death. Worldwide people protested this sentencing, and in response the military deployed an additional 5,000 troops to Ogoniland. Finally, on 10 November 1995, the nine were hanged in Port Harcourt. An observer of the Tribunal said that it was "not merely wrong, illogical or perverse. It is downright dishonest .. I believe that the Tribunal first decided on its verdict and then sought for arguments to justify them".

=== Traditional Ogoni burial practices prohibited ===
According to Lazarus Baribiae Saale of the Niger Delta University, "wake-keep and all-important rites given to heroes in the Ogoni tradition were not allowed by the Military Government. Ogoni land during this period was militarized and those who wore black clothes were arrested for mourning these activists."

== Aftermath ==
The nine hanged men are buried in the Port Harcourt Cemetery, in southeastern Nigeria. The MOSOP still meets and works towards further protection and resilience of the Ogoni people. They continue to fight for their rights and land, by stopping Shell from drilling on their land and working with the international community on environmental lawsuits. Since the execution of the Ogoni Nine, throughout the early 2000s, there have been numerous spills and extraction-related fires throughout Nigeria.

Since 1993, there has been no continued drilling in Ogoniland; however, the land remains decimated, and underground pipelines continue to leak. This has furthered environmental degradation of the area. While Shell has not cleaned it up, they paid 55 million pounds in reparations in 2014 for two oil spills that occurred in 2008. Across Ogoniland, gas flares and acid rain have stopped, but the vegetation and lands continue to be polluted. Ogoni Day continues to be commemorated on 4 January each year, marking the 30-year anniversary in 2023.

On 12 June 2025, Nigerian Democracy Day, President Bola Tinubu granted a posthumous pardon to the Ogoni Nine. He honoured Ken Saro-Wiwa with the Commander of the Order of the Niger (CON). The Ogoni Four also received Order of the Niger (OON), which is the second highest national award in Nigeria.

== See also ==
- Wiwa family lawsuits against Royal Dutch Shell
- Movement for the Survival of the Ogoni People
- Kiobel v. Royal Dutch Petroleum Co.
- Rossport Five
