= Enterprise Oil =

British oil company

- Type: Public
- Industry: Oil and gas
- Founded: 1983
- Defunct: 2002
- Fate: Acquired
- Successor: Royal Dutch Shell
- Headquarters: London, England, UK
- Key people: Sir Graham Hearne, (Chairman)

Enterprise Oil was a major UK independent exploration and production company based in Europe, with core areas of activity in the United Kingdom and Ireland, mainland Europe, Brazil and the Gulf of Mexico. The company was once a constituent of the FTSE 100 Index but was acquired by Royal Dutch Shell.

== History ==
Enterprise Oil was formed in 1983 to exploit the North Sea oil production assets of the then state-owned British Gas plc: it was privatised and its shares first listed on the London Stock Exchange in February 1984. In 1994 the company was involved in a high-profile but unsuccessful bid to acquire Lasmo.

The Corrib gas field was discovered off the coast of Ireland by Enterprise Oil in 1996, and has proved especially troublesome for Shell (see Corrib gas controversy). In the last few years of the company's existence it was also investing significant sums in its Brazilian oil interests.

The Most Reverend Justin Welby, Archbishop of Canterbury and former Bishop of Durham, served as Group Treasurer from 1984 to 1987.

The company was purchased by Royal Dutch Shell for £3.5bn in 2002.

== Operations ==
The company had interests in some 41 fields, mainly in the North Sea; it had also made at least one major discovery in the Gulf of Mexico. It was initially based in London but whilst keeping its head office there, in 1998 it moved its UK operations to its office in Aberdeen.
