= The Pipe =

- Directed by: Risteard Ó Domhnaill
- Produced by: Rachel Lysaght
- Edited by: Nigel O'Regan, Stephen O'Connell
- Music by: Stephen Rennicks
- Production companies: Scannáin Inbhear; Underground Films; Riverside Television
- Distributed by: Cinetic Media
- Release date: 3 December 2010
- Running time: 80 minutes
- Country: Ireland
- Language: English

The Pipe (Irish: An Píopa) is a 2010 Irish documentary film about the Shell to Sea campaign, when a small village stood up to Big Oil.
