= Rossport Five =

Irish activists against a gas pipeline

The Rossport Five address a rally in Dublin after their release

The Rossport Five (Irish: Cúigear Ros Dumhach) are Willie Corduff, brothers Philip and Vincent McGrath, Micheál Ó Seighin and James Brendan Philbin, from Kilcommon parish, Erris, County Mayo, Ireland. In 2005, they were jailed for civil contempt of court after refusing to obey a temporary court injunction forbidding them to interfere with work being undertaken by Shell on their land.

== History ==
Justice Finnegan, President of the High Court of Ireland, jailed the five on 29 June 2005 for civil contempt of court after refusing to obey a temporary court injunction forbidding them to interfere with work being undertaken by Shell on their land. The committal order was sought by Shell who intended to build a high pressure raw gas pipeline across land in Rossport to pipe gas from the offshore Corrib Gas Field. Three of the five men own land in Rossport: Vincent McGrath and Ó Seighin were brought to court along with them as they had assisted in blocking the Shell workers. About thirty others who had done the same were not charged.

There were protests all over Ireland during the period of the men's imprisonment, with filling stations of Shell, and its junior partner Statoil, being picketed and blockaded by both political activists and ordinary members of the public. The protests were driven by the Shell to Sea campaign (then TD Jerry Cowley liaised with the men in prison) which took its name following a meeting with Burren campaigners in January 2005 Shell to Sea. Defending his company's stance, and despite the nationwide protests, Shell Ireland's CEO Andy Pyle tried to play down the widespread support for the men and said: "The fact is that we've gone through a process, and we have five people who don't like the outcome." All Shell sites around Rossport and Bellinaboy were blockaded by the men's neighbours, preventing work. Local TD Michael Ring said that Ireland was now a "dictatorship within a democracy". In an unusual move by the Irish judiciary, the men were told that a judge would be on hand at any time of day or night if they wanted to purge their contempt, by promising they would no longer hinder Shell employees.

The men were released from Cloverhill Prison on 30 September 2005, after 94 days, when Shell applied to the High Court to have the injunction lifted. This came after intense media and political scrutiny of the case.

== Post-imprisonment ==
The five men and their supporters continued to campaign on the issue. In September 2006, a TNS/MRBI poll of adults in Mayo, commissioned by RTÉ, showed 66% supported the stance taken by the five men in their defiance of the court order, 20% did not.

In December 2006, an account of events leading up their imprisonment was published by the Rossport Five. There was a second printing of the book (Our Story, The Rossport 5) in January 2007.

In April 2007, Willie Corduff won the Goldman Environmental Prize on behalf of Europe. No government representative was present, though representatives were present from other countries for their winners.

In April 2008, Vincent McGrath, Mícheál Ó Seighin, his wife Caitlín and son-in-law John Monaghan, among a few others, split from Shell to Sea and set up Pobal Chill Chomáin (PCC), a parochial grouping concerned primarily with health and safety issues. PCC have not held a public meeting in the parish or elsewhere since early 2011 and are, to all intents and purposes, defunct.

== See also ==
- Ogoni Nine
