= Corrib gas project =

Irish offshore natural gas field

Corrib gas field
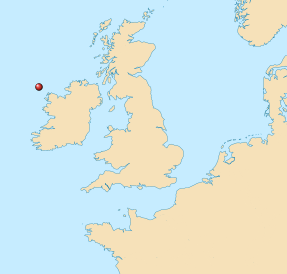
- Location of the Corrib gas field
- Country: Ireland
- Region: Slyne Trough basin
- Location: west of the Mullet Peninsula, County Mayo
- Block: 18/20; 18/25
- Offshore/onshore: offshore
- Operator: Vermilion Energy
- Partners: Vermilion Energy (56.5%); Canada Pension Plan Investment Board (43.5%)

Field history
- Discovery: 1996
- Start of development: 2004
- Start of production: 2015

Production
- Estimated gas in place: 1,000×10^{9} cu ft (28×10^{9} m^{3})
- Recoverable gas: 594×10^{9} cu ft (16.8×10^{9} m^{3})
- Producing formations: Triassic Sandstones

The Corrib gas project (Irish: Tionscanamh Ghás Aiceanta na Coiribe) is a developed natural gas deposit located in the Atlantic Ocean, approximately 83 kilometres (52 mi) off the northwest coast of County Mayo, Ireland. The project includes a natural gas pipeline and an onshore gas processing plant, which commenced gas production in 2015. During its development, the project attracted considerable opposition.

The Corrib field is Ireland's only domestic source of natural gas production.

== History ==
The deepwater exploration licence No. 2/93 covering four blocks in the Slyne Trough was granted on 1 January 1993 for a period of 11 years to Enterprise Oil and its partners Saga Petroleum Ireland Limited, Statoil Exploration (Ireland) Limited, and Marathon International Petroleum Hibernia Limited. The licence was issued under the licensing terms for offshore oil and gas exploration and development 1992. The Corrib natural gas field was discovered in 1996. It was the first reported commercial natural gas discovery in Ireland since the Kinsale Head gas field was discovered in 1971. The first appraisal well was drilled in 1997. A number of consents and approvals to develop the Corrib Project were issued in 2001.

In 2002, Enterprise was acquired by Shell, who took over the operatorship of the project. Development of the project began in 2004, but it was delayed in 2005 when locals opposed the project. Shell announced the suspension of the project to facilitate further discussions with opposing parties. For a year, independent safety reviews were conducted to address various safety concerns in relation to the project.

In 1999, Saga Petroleum became a part of a Norsk Hydro and, in 2007, a part of Statoil. In July 2009, Vermilion Energy acquired Marathon Oil's stake in the project.

Until 2018, Shell was the operator of the project with a 45% ownership stake. In 2018, Shell sold its share of the project to the Canada Pension Plan Investment Board. As part of the transaction, Vermilion Energy became the project's operator and expanded its ownership share to 20%. In 2021, Vermilion acquired Equinor's 36.5% stake for $434 million (€382 million), becoming the majority owner of the gas field.

== Development ==
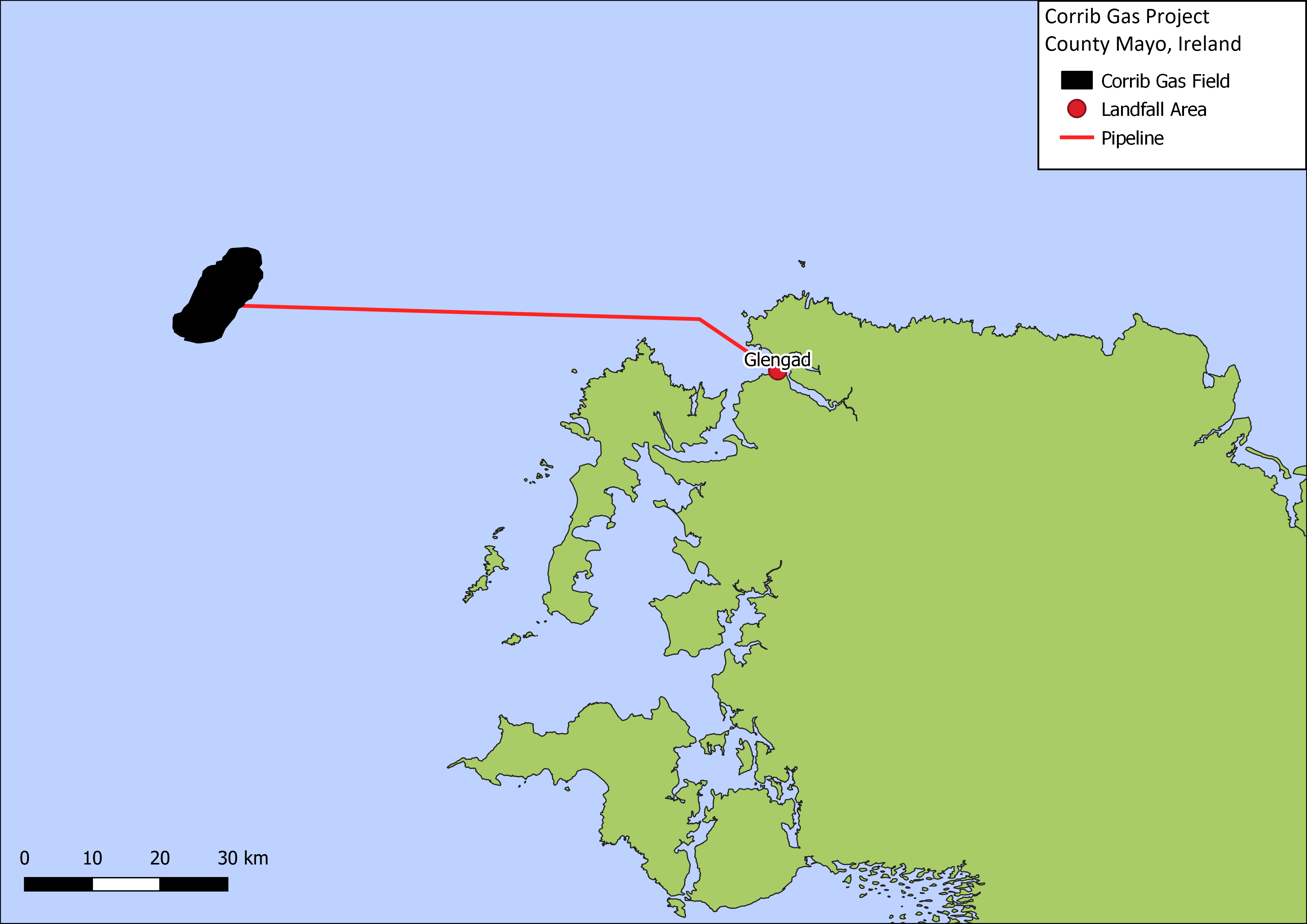
Map of the Corrib Gas Offshore Pipeline

Royal Dutch Shell proposed to develop the Corrib field as a sub-sea production facility with onshore processing. The project included development of offshore installations, including the wells and subsea facilities, construction of offshore and onshore pipelines, and construction of onshore processing plant at Bellanaboy.

=== Gas field ===
The Corrib gas field is located about 83 kilometres (52 mi) off Erris Head in County Mayo, in an area known as the Slyne Trough in water depths of 355 metres (1,165 ft). Reserves in the field are believed to be about 1 trillion cubic feet (28×10^{9} m^{3}), 70% of the volume of the Kinsale field. The gas originates from a Triassic Sandstone reservoir 3,000 metres (9,800 ft) below the seabed. The natural gas in the Corrib Gas Field is a very pure form of gas, consisting of approximately 97% methane and ethane. The Corrib gas does not contain hydrogen sulfide and carbon dioxide makes up only 0.3% of the total amount of gas. There are five production wells at the Corrib field, drilled by Transocean Sedco 711 semi-submersible drilling rig. Each well has a "christmas tree" structure above it that contains the control and monitoring equipment. This subsea production system was constructed by Vetco, the offshore drilling and production supplier. Flexible individual flowlines will run from each well to a production manifold which will feed the gas into the main pipeline. There is no production platform installed in the field. Production at the gas field is remotely controlled from the Bellanaboy Bridge terminal.

Corrib Gas is expected to run out in 2026 or 2027 as its production peaked before 2020.

=== Pipeline ===
The pipeline from the Corrib field to the landfall at Glengad is approximately 90 km in length. The pipeline has a diameter of 20 inches (510 mm) and it operates at pressures of 120–345 bars (12,000–34,500 kPa). Work on the offshore section took place in summer 2009 and involved over 7,000 lengths of pipe being welded together on board the Solitaire pipelaying vessel. The onshore pipeline is 9 kilometres (5.6 mi) in length and runs from landfall to the processing plant.

=== Processing plant ===
Gas is processed at the processing plant inland, near Bellanaboy Bridge. The purpose of the plant is to dry the gas and remove impurities. The plant has a capacity of 10 million standard cubic metres of purified gas per day. Processed gas is fed to the Bord Gáis gas grid. The piping for the onshore processing plant was manufactured by Phoenix Pipes Limited in Slane, County Meath.

== Controversy ==
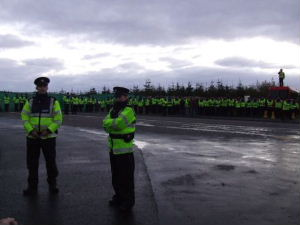
Gardaí guard the Bellanaboy terminal site from occupation by protesters

Some opponents of the scheme cited concerns about the health, safety and environmental impact of the onshore aspects of the project. Others were concerned with alleged irregularities and precedents surrounding the project. Many groups, most notably the Rossport Five and Shell to Sea campaigns, opposed the current plans for the project, which they regarded as dangerous despite assurances from Shell. A contrary position is taken by the group Pro Gas Mayo.

A film about the project, The Pipe, was released on 8 July 2010 at the Galway Film Festival.

=== Safety and environmental concerns ===
==== Pipeline route ====
The upstream high pressure gas pipeline connecting the wells to the inland processing site runs through the area of Rossport, close to local residences. A report by Dr. Richard Kupriewicz concluded that "the terrain makes escape routes for the clustered population essentially impossible in the event of a [pipeline] rupture".

==== Discharges from drying process ====
Broadhaven Bay is the proposed area to discharge waste from the refining process

=== Planning problems ===
Planning permission was initially refused by the board of An Bord Pleanála (the Irish planning authority). Senior planning inspector Kevin Moore's report stated in part:

It is my submission that the proposed development of a large gas processing terminal at this rural, scenic, and unserviced area on a bogland hill some 8 kilometres inland from the Mayo coastland landfall location, with all its site development works difficulties, public safety concerns, adverse visual, ecological, and traffic impacts, and a range of other significant environmental impacts, defies any rational understanding of the term "sustainability".

In November 2009, An Bord Pleanála ordered Shell to redesign the pipeline and move its route away from homes saying it posed an "unacceptable risk".

== Tax ==
Claims of a tax yield of some €1.7 billion over the life of the field have been made by the Irish government, based on data about the field's size and 2008 gas prices. Until 2007, the Irish Petroleum Licensing Terms imposed a flat 25% income tax on gas production revenues. In August 2007, the top rate of tax on the most profitable fields was increased to 40%. The new licensing terms called for changes to the tax imposed based upon fields' profit ratios (equal to the rate of profit less 25% divided by the accumulated level of capital investment). Where this ratio is greater than 4.5, an additional 15% tax was imposed, where it is between 3.0 and 4.5 an additional 10% was imposed and where the profit ratio is between 1.5 and 3.0, and additional 5% tax was added. Less profitable fields were not affected.

== Employment ==
The construction of the pipeline and plant was expected by Shell's economic consultants, Goodbody Economic Consultants, to create 800 temporary jobs and boost the local Mayo economy by approximately €181 million. The plant was expected by Shell to employ approximately 55 workers when operational.

During the project, over 1,100 staff were employed in construction, with over €320 million paid out in wages; the plant went on to employ 150 people.
