= Vermilion Energy =

Energy company

Vermilion Energy Inc.
- Type: Public
- Traded as: TSX: VET; NYSE: VET; S&P/TSX Composite Component
- Industry: Petroleum
- Founded: 1994
- Headquarters: Calgary, Alberta, Canada
- Key people: Lorenzo Donadeo, Executive Chair; Dion Hatcher, President
- Products: Oil, natural gas
- Production output: 83,994 boe/d
- Revenue: ▼US$ 2.008 billion (2023)
- Net income: ▼US$ -237.6 million (2023)
- Total assets: ▼US$6.236 billion (2023)
- Number of employees: 740
- Website: vermilionenergy.com

Vermilion Energy is an international energy producer based in Calgary, Canada. It has operations in North America, Europe and Australia. Vermilion is listed on the Toronto Stock Exchange and the New York Stock Exchange.

== History ==
Vermilion was founded in 1994 as a Canadian oil and gas exploration and production company focused on assets in Alberta, Canada.

In 1997, Vermilion expanded internationally through the acquisition of oil-producing assets in France. Since 1997, Vermilion has continued to add assets to its portfolio with operations across North America, Europe and Australia.

The company changed its status to that of a trust in December 2002 when it became known as Vermilion Energy Trust for eight years; in September 2010, it converted back to a corporation.

In 2004, Vermilion started to operate in the Netherlands. The following year in 2005, Vermilion completed an acquisition of 60% of the offshore Wandoo field and platform located on the northwest shelf of Australia.

Vermilion acquired an 18.5% non-operating stake in the Corrib field in the Republic of Ireland from Marathon Oil in 2009, which grew to 20% along with operatorship when Royal Dutch Shell exited the project in 2018. In 2021, Vermilion acquired Equinor's 36.5% stake for $434 million (€382 million), increasing its share of the gas field to 56.5%.

In March 2013, Vermilion began trading on the NYSE under the ticker symbol "VET". Vermilion entered the US market with the acquisition of properties in the Powder River Basin of northeastern Wyoming in 2014. Vermilion acquired a 25% non-operated interest in four producing natural gas fields in Germany from GDF Suez in February 2014. Also that year, Vermilion was awarded its first concession in Hungary, representing Vermilion’s initial entry into Central and Eastern Europe.

In April 2018, Vermilion announced the acquisition of Spartan Energy, a Saskatchewan-focused light oil producer, for $1.4 billion. The following year, Vermilion drilled two successful natural gas wells in Croatia.

The strategic acquisition of Leucrotta Exploration was announced on May 31, 2022, marking Vermilion’s entry into the prolific Montney resource play in Canada.

In February 2024, Vermilion Energy announced the acquisition of Westbrick Energy Ltd.

== Operations ==
In Canada, Vermilion's operations are focused in the West Pembina region near Drayton Valley in Alberta, in the Peace River Arch in northeast British Columbia and northwest Alberta and the Northgate Region of southeast Saskatchewan and southwest Manitoba.

Vermilion's activities in the United States are targeting oil and gas development in the Turner Sands tight-oil play.

Vermilion has become the largest oil producer in France. In 2017, under a new climate change bill, Vermilion will no longer be an oil producer for France as of 2040. The company estimates there are more than 1.7 billion barrels of original oil in place in the five biggest conventional oil pools.

In the Netherlands, the company has undeveloped land base approximately 800,000 acres (3,200 km^{2}). The Netherlands is characterized by high impact natural gas drilling and development. Vermilion's natural gas production in the Netherlands is priced of Title Transfer Facility (TTF).

In Germany, the company’s assets include four natural gas fields across 11 production licenses, covering 1,100,000 acres (4,500 km²) in the North German Basin.

Vermilion is the operator and minority owner of the Corrib gas project in Ireland. At peak production, the Corrib project has been projected to supply 60-65% of the country's natural gas demand and over 90% of the country's natural gas production. First-gas from Corrib began on 30 December 2015.

Wandoo is Vermilion's Australian asset, an offshore oil field and platform approximately 80 kilometres (50 mi) off the northwest coast of Australia. Wandoo production receives a premium to Brent Crude pricing. Vermilion originally purchased a 60% operated interest in Wandoo in 2005. The company then purchased the remaining 40% interest in Wandoo in 2007.

== See also ==
- Canadian petroleum companies
