= Solitaire (1971 ship) =

Maltese pipe-laying ship

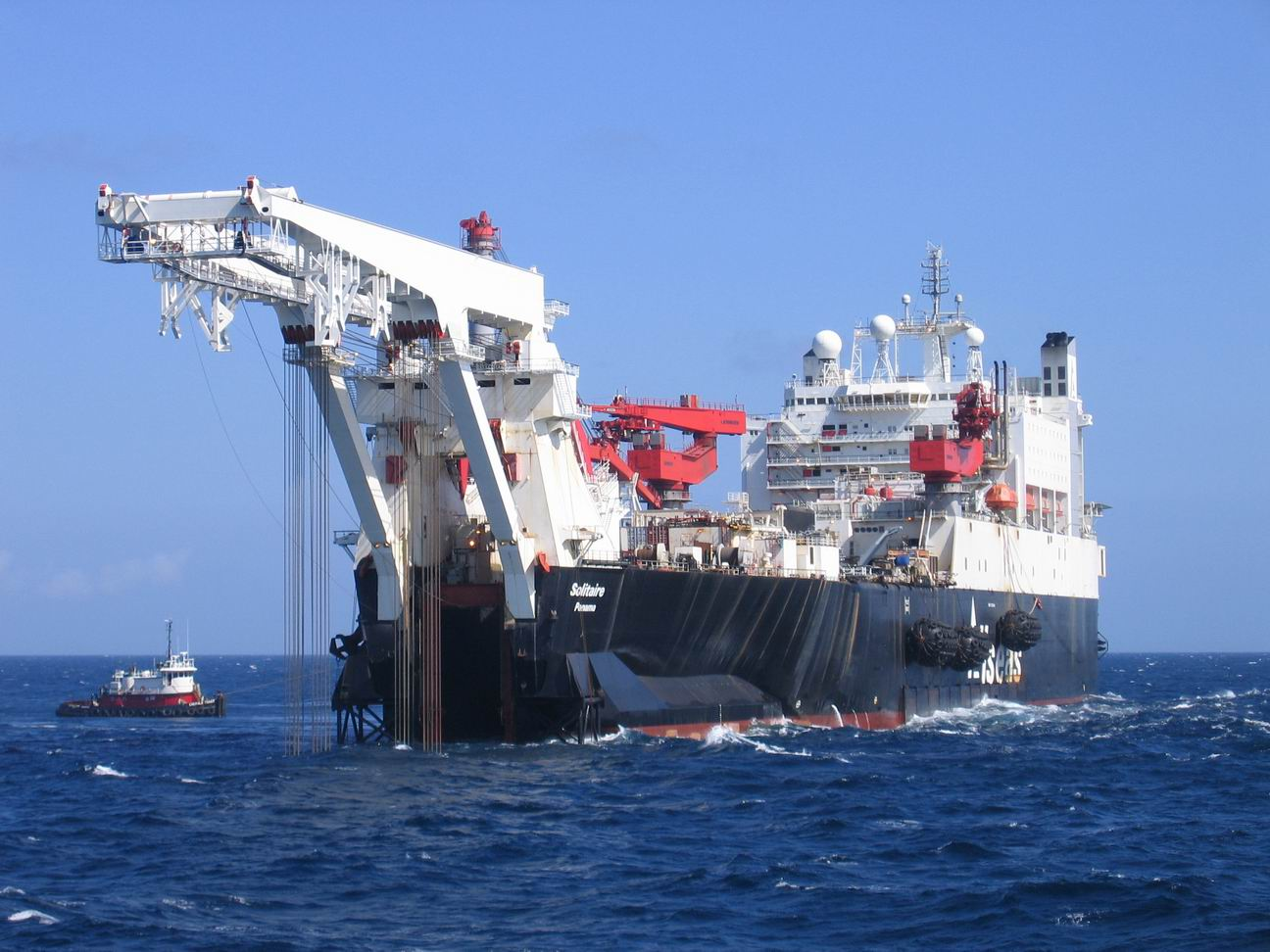
- Solitaire, one of the largest pipe-laying ships in the world

History
- Name: Trentwood; Solitaire
- Owner: Allseas Group
- Port of registry: -2015: Panama, Panama; 2015 onwards: Valletta, Malta
- Builder: Mitsubishi Heavy Industries, Hiroshima, Japan
- Yard number: 223
- Launched: 17 December 1971
- Completed: 1972
- Identification: IMO number: 7129049; MMSI number: 249118000; Callsign: 9HA4114
- Status: In service

General characteristics
- Tonnage: 59193; DWT: 129479
- Length: 300 m (984 ft)
- Beam: 40.6 m (133.2 ft)
- Draught: 17.62 m
- Depth: 24.00 m
- Propulsion: 8x Wartsila 6R46B , 51.50 MW
- Speed: 14.5 kn
- Crew: 420

Solitaire is a large deep-sea pipe laying ship. It was at the time of conversion the world's largest pipe-laying ship at 300 metres (984 ft) long (excluding pipe-laying apparatus) and 96,000 tonnes (94,000 long tons; 106,000 short tons). When fully operational she has a crew of 420, a pipe carrying capacity of 22,000 tonnes and a pipe lay speed of more than 9 kilometres (5.6 mi) a day. The ship is owned by the Allseas Group, a Dutch pipelaying and marine construction firm with their headquarters in Switzerland.

== History ==
The ship was initially built in 1972 as a bulk carrier and launched as Trentwood by Mitsubishi Heavy Industries at their shipyard in Hiroshima, Japan.

In 1992, Allseas acquired Trentwood for conversion into a pipelaying vessel. Allseas awarded the conversion contract to Sembawang Shipyards in Singapore on a lump sum basis; however, the contract was terminated in 1995. The ship was subsequently converted at the Swan Hunter yard on Tyneside, United Kingdom. Solitaire laid her first pipe on Statoil's Europipe project in 1999.

Allseas and Sembcorp reached a settlement for the Solitaire arbitration in 2006.

In 2006, while working on the Atwater Valley and Independence Trail projects in the Gulf of Mexico, Solitaire set new depth records, laying 10-inch pipeline in a water depth of 2,775 metres (9,104 ft) and 24-inch pipeline in a water depth of 2,550 metres (8,370 ft).

Among other ships, Solitaire laid the Nord Stream 2 gas pipeline in the Baltic Sea in 2019—2020.
