= Glengad =

Gleann an Ghad / Dún Ceartáin Glengad / Dooncarton
- Village
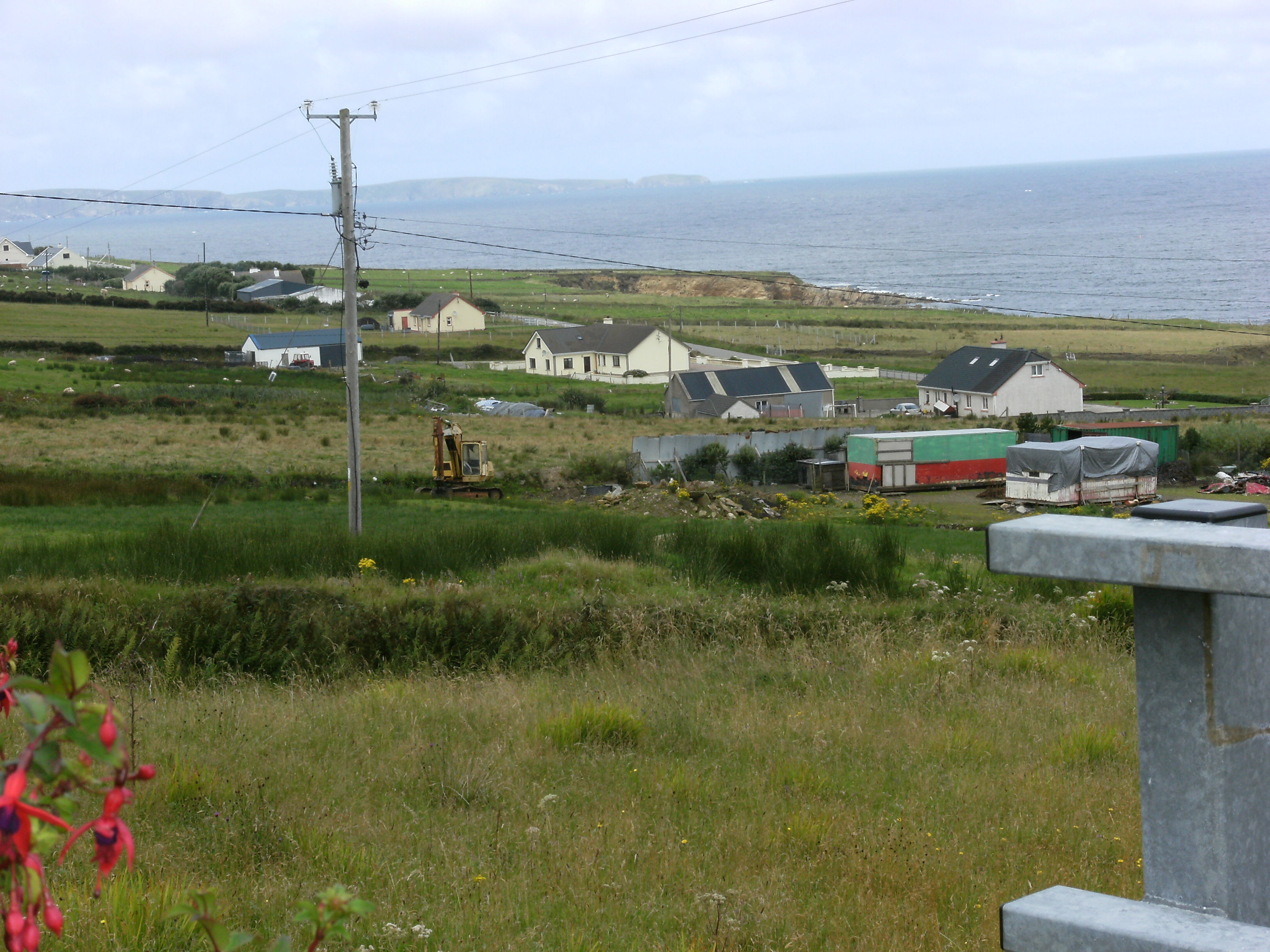
- Glengad, overlooking Sruwaddacon Bay.

- Location in Ireland
- Coordinates: 54°16′41″N 9°49′07″W
- Country: Ireland
- Province: Connacht
- County: County Mayo

Glengad (Irish: Gleann an Ghad, meaning 'valley of the withes') is a Gaeltacht village in the parish of Kilcommon in northwest County Mayo, Ireland. It is also known as Dooncarton (Irish: Dún Ceartáin, meaning 'Cartan's Fort'), a name which comes from an Iron Age tribal chieftain called Ciortan, a character who appears in the Ulster Cycle legend of the Táin Bó Flidhais.

The village which is largely linear and without a main street, lies to the northwest and northeast of Dooncarton Hill in the parish of Kilcommon in Erris. The different areas of Glengad are known under different names. Glengad East is known as Baile Grainne. Middle Glengad was known as Spleckstown and Baile Lecan. West Glengad or Old Glengad was and still is known as Sean Bhaile. Every house in the village looks over Shruth Fhada Con meaning Long hound bay but which is commonly called Sruwaddacon Bay or Broadhaven Bay below.

It has a proliferation of prehistoric archaeology including several megalithic tombs of differing types including wedge, court and portal dolmens, and a well preserved stone circle in Baile Lecan.

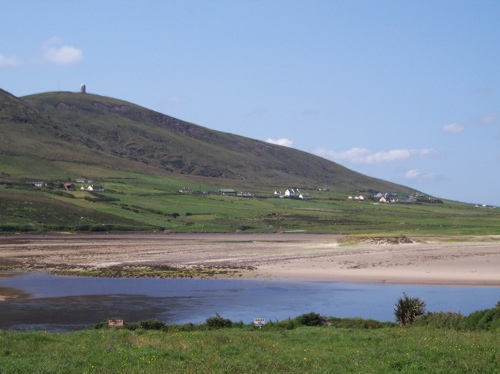
Dooncarton mountain in Glengad.

Much of Glengad is a Special Area of Conservation and Sruwaddacon Bay is both an S.A.C. and a S.P.A (Birds Directive) – Special Protected Area for Birds. It is also an E.U. protected Natural Heritage Area.

Unfortunately for the local sand martins whose nest holes were in the cliffs at Glengad Beach, Royal Dutch Shell sent in their diggers and removed the cliffs, placing nets to stop the birds returning. The 'new' temporary cliffs they rebuilt mechanically don't hold the same appeal for the species.

Caubeen Mountain (Dooncarton) sweeps down to Broadhaven Bay and Sruwaddacon Estuary and has spectacular and scenic views.

Glengad is the proposed landfall site for the contentious pipeline from the Corrib gas field, and is the ongoing scene of protests against the project.

== Major landslide area ==
A major landslide consisting of 40 separate landslides hit the Glengad area on 19 September 2003. The previous recorded landslide in the parish was in 1937.

The Geological Survey of Ireland produced a report on reasons for the major landslide.

== See also ==
- Kilcommon
- Erris

== Sources ==
- Nolan, R. Within the Mullet (1997) Longford
- Noone, Fr. Sean, Where the Sun Sets (1997) Pollathomas
- Stonepages
- Westropp, T. J. Promontory Forts of Erris (1912) Dublin
