= Wiwa =

Wiwa may refer to:

== People ==
Given name

- Wiwa Korowi (born 1948), sixth Governor-General of Papua New Guinea

Surname

- Jim Wiwa (1904–2005), chief of the Ogoni people of southern Nigeria, and the chairman of the Council of Chiefs of Bane
- Ken Wiwa (1968–2016), also known as Ken Saro-Wiwa, Jr, Nigerian journalist and author
- Ken Saro-Wiwa, (1941–1995), Nigerian writer, television producer, environmental activist
- Noo Saro-Wiwa, British/Nigerian writer and journalist
- Owens Wiwa (born 1957), Nigerian medical doctor and human rights activist
- Zina Saro-Wiwa, Nigerian video artist and filmmaker

== Radio stations ==
- WIWA (AM), a radio station (1270 AM) licensed to serve Eatonville, Florida, United States
- WRLZ (AM), a radio station (1160 AM) licensed to serve St. Cloud, Florida, which held the call sign WIWA from 2006 to 2019

== Others ==
- Wiwa people, an ethnic group indigenous to the area around the Sierra Nevada de Santa Marta mountains in Colombia.
- Wiwa language, a Chibchan language spoken in northern Colombia
- Wiwa v. Royal Dutch Shell Co., three separate lawsuits brought by the family of Ken Saro-Wiwa against Royal Dutch Shell
