= Eyo festival =

Festival in Nigeria by the Yoruba people

Eyo Festival
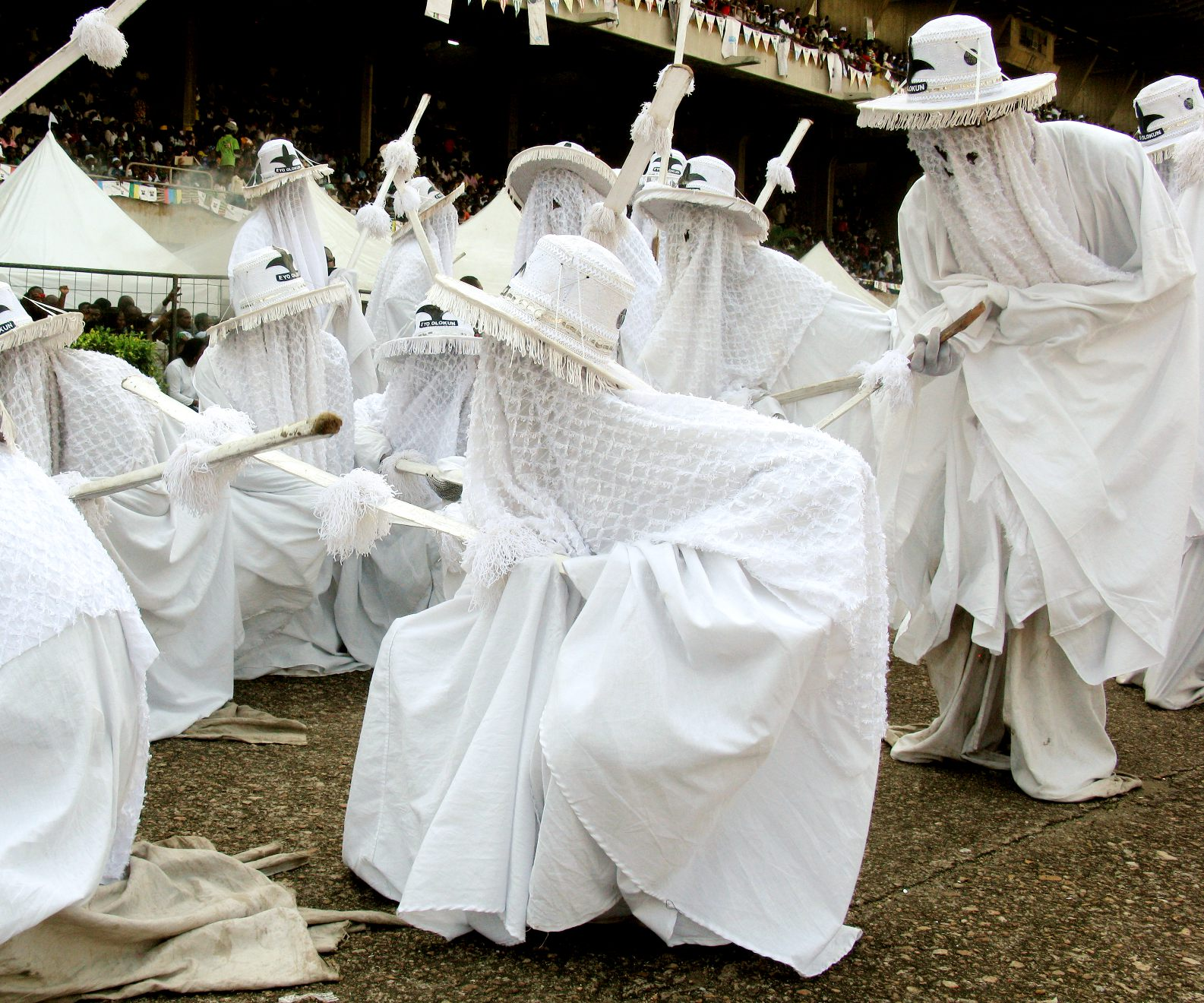
- Nickname: Adamu Orisha Play
- Status: Active
- Genre: Festival
- Begins: 1780
- Location: Lagos State
- Country: Nigeria
- Head of Eyo: Chief Kabiru Oshodi

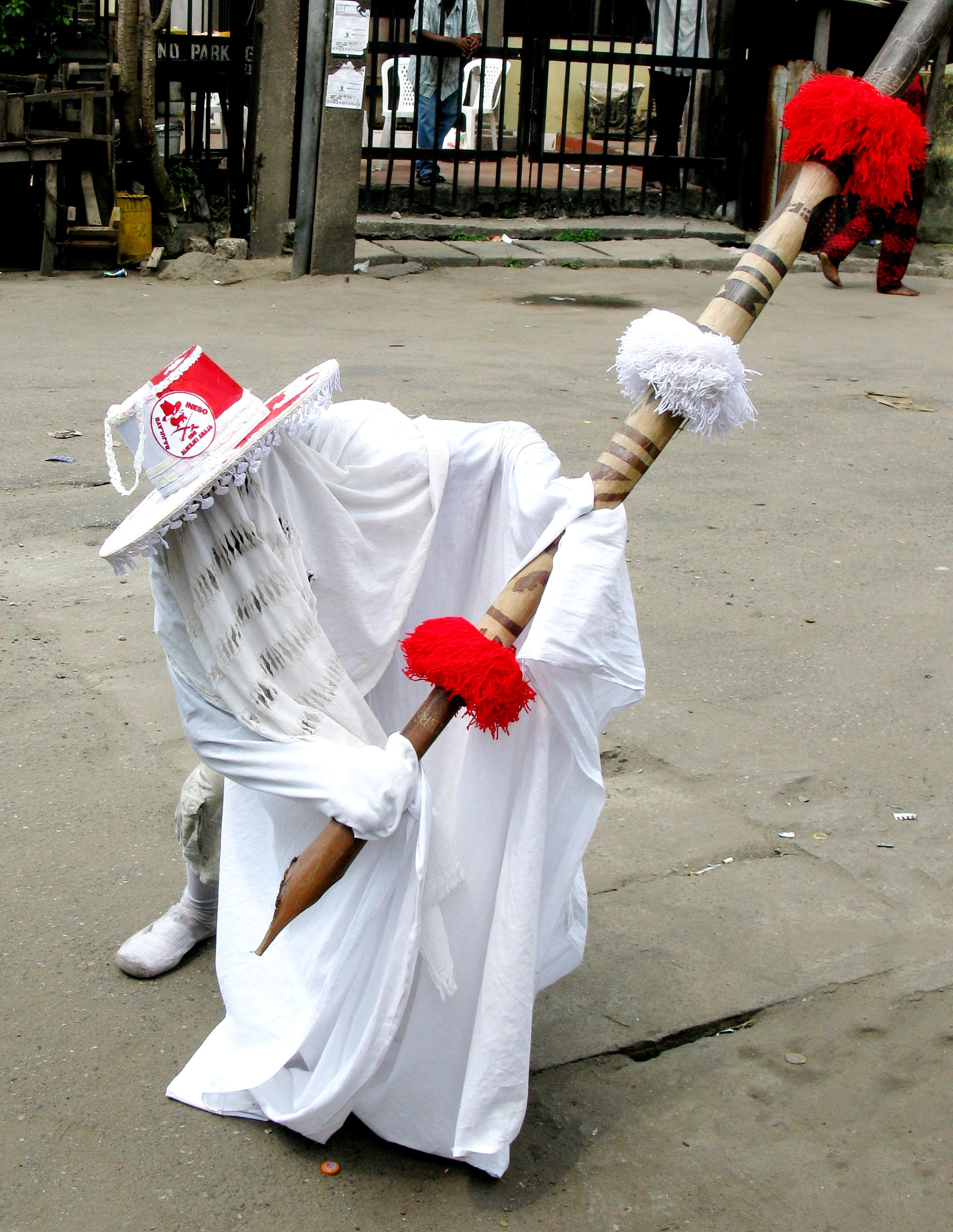
Eyo Bajulaiye Ineso masquerade in a residential area of Lagos near the Tafawa Balewa Square.

The Eyo Festival, otherwise known as the Adamu Orisha Play, is a Yoruba festival unique to Lagos, Nigeria and has a strong historical footing in Iperu-Remo, a town in Ikenne Local Government, Ogun State. In modern times, it is presented by the people of Lagos as a tourist event. Due to the history of its development, it is traditionally performed on Lagos Island. A notable festival date was in 2000 commemorating Justice G.B.A. Coker, a Lagos high chief, the Olori Adimu and the Olori Eyo of the Adimu Eyo cultural masquerade. Chief Kabiru Adeshina Oshodi, a high chief who is a member of the Eyo Laba is the Heads of all Eyo masquerades in Lagos making him the Olori Eleyo of Lagos.

== Eyo ==
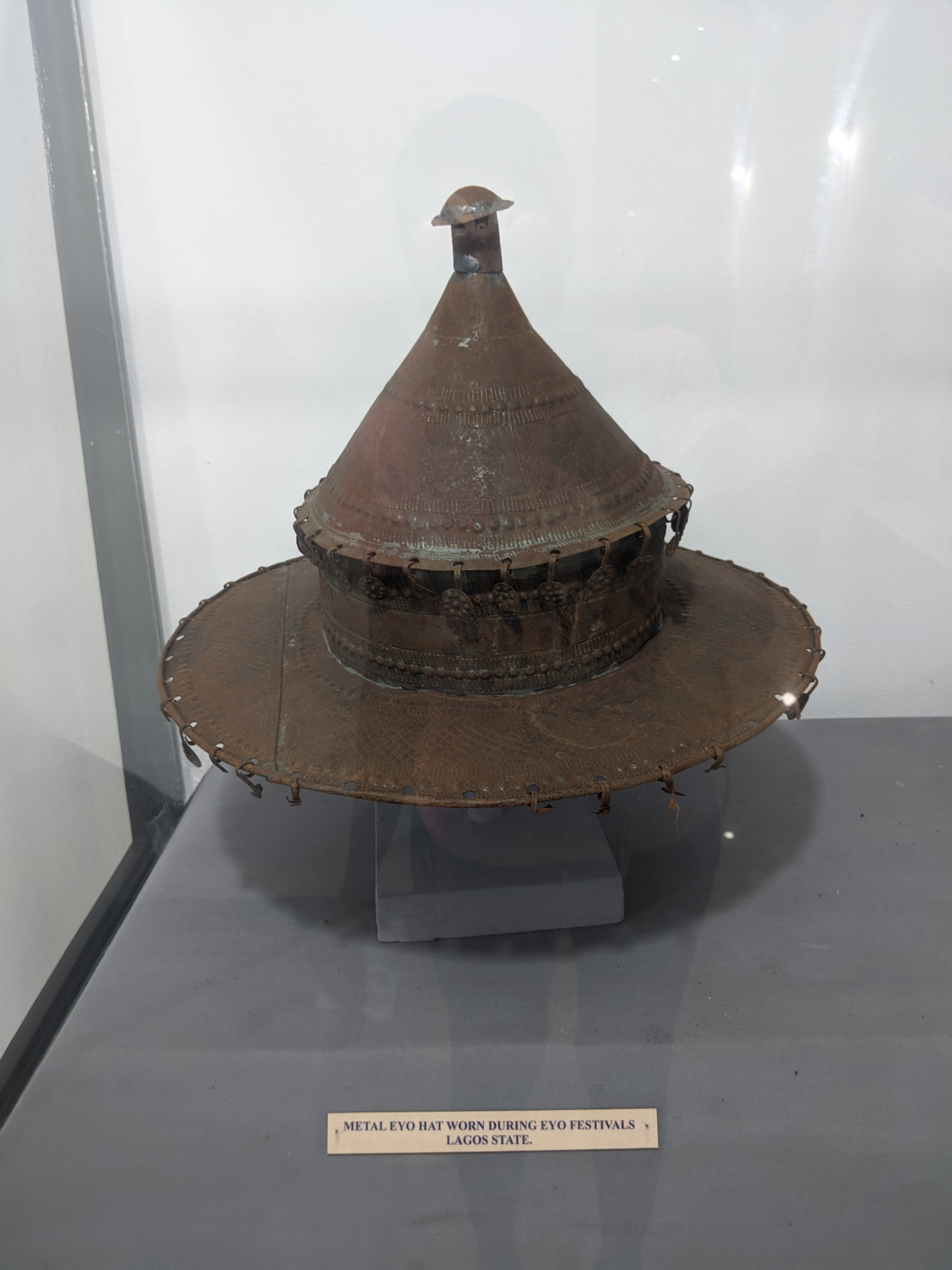
Metal Eyo hat worn during Eyo festivals on Lagos Island

The word "Eyo" also refers to the costumed dancers, known as the masquerades, that come out during the festival. The origins of this observance are found in the inner workings of the secret societies of Lagos. Back in the day, the Eyo festival was held to escort the soul of a departed Lagos King or Chief and to usher in a new king. On Eyo Day, the main highway in the heart of the city (from the end of Carter Bridge to Tinubu Square) is closed to traffic, allowing for procession from Idumota to the Iga Idunganran palace. The white-clad Eyo masquerades represent the spirits of the dead, and are referred to in Yoruba as "agogoro Eyo" (literally: "tall Eyo").

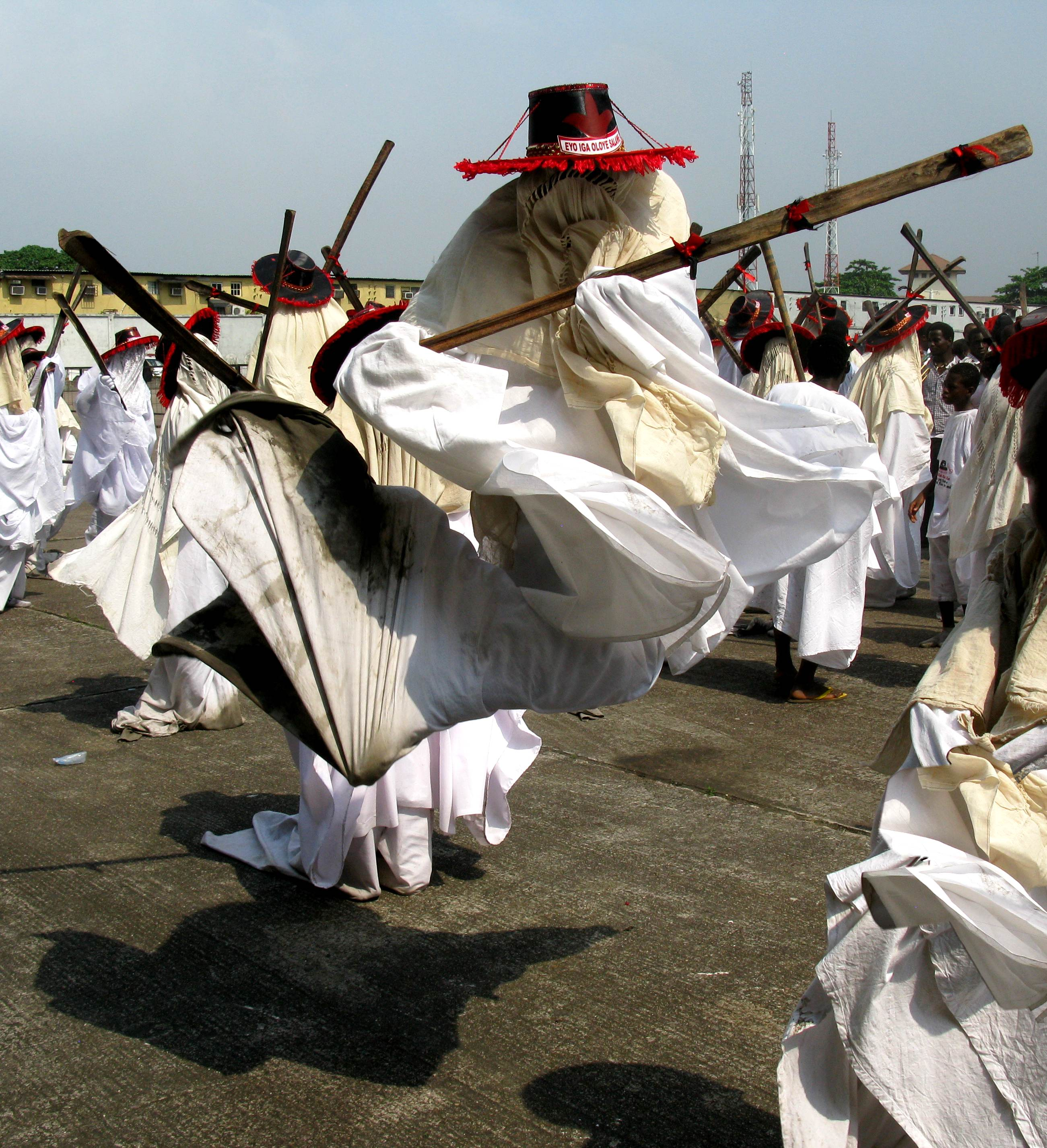
An Eyo Iga Olowe Salaye masquerade jumping.

The first procession in Lagos was on 20 February 1854, to commemorate the life of the Oba Akitoye. Eyos (the masquerades) celebrate a Oba's (king) life. Eyo Festival is a homage to his death. The ritual is also organized to commemorate the election of a new leader. Traditionally, it only occurs at these times. Nowadays, and because it is such a traditional festival, it can be celebrated for the death of a notable person, or to celebrate a special occasion such as visits by heads of state.

Here, the participants all pay homage to the reigning Oba of Lagos. The festival takes place whenever occasion and tradition demand, though it is usually held as part of the final burial rites of a highly regarded chief in the king's court.

Among the Yorubas, the indigenous religions have largely lost the greater majority of their traditional followers to Christianity and Islam. Be that as it may, the old festivals are still almost universally observed as tourist attractions which generate large amounts of revenue for government and small business around the Lagos Island venue of the Eyo festival. It is during these occasions that their traditional monarchs and nobles exercise the most of their residual power.

== Order of events ==
In his book Nigerian Festivals, travel writer and culture reporter Pelu Awofeso notes: A full week before the festival (always a Sunday), the ‘senior’ eyo group, the Adimu (identified by a black, broad-rimmed hat), goes public with a staff. When this happens, it means the event will take place on the following Saturday. Each of the four other Eyo groups — Laba (Red), Oniko (yellow), Ologede (Green) and Agere (Purple) — take their turns in that order from Monday to Thursday.

== History ==
Historically originating in the 18th century as a secret society ritual, its primary purpose is to escort the soul of a departed king (Oba) or chief to the afterlife and to usher in a new leader. Eyo festival is a major Yoruba cultural event unique to Lagos, Nigeria. It has always been celebrated in Lagos Island. There are five Eyo orisa and others are of palace chiefs.

Names of the families and Iga of Eyo each represents are:

1. Eyo Adimu which is the main celebrant, identified by white/black hat.
2. Eyo Laba, identified by the red hat.
3. Eyo Oniko, identified by the yellow hat.
4. Eyo Ologede, identified by the green hat.
5. Eyo Agere, identified by the purple hat.

== Festival dates ==
=== 2000 ===
- 2000, c ommemorating Justice G.B.A. Coker, a Lagos high chiefs, the Olori Adimu and the Olori Eyo of the Adimu Eyo cultural masquerade.

=== 2009 ===
- 2009, Eyo play of 2009 was performed in memory Chief T.O.S. Benson, S.A.N., First Republic Minister of Information and Broadcasting and an illustrious son of the state, who held the traditional titles of 'Baba Oba' (Father of the King) of Lagos and Baba Sale of Isale Eko.

=== 2011 ===
- 26 November, commemorating Prince Yesufu Abiodun Oniru, a Lagos nobleman.

=== 2017 ===
- 20 May, commemorating the 50th anniversary of Lagos state tagged Lagos @50 and also to commemorate the life and times of the late Oba of Ikate Kingdom: Oba Yekini Adeniyi Elegushi (Kunsela II).

2025

• December 27, commemorating four outstanding figures who helped shape Lagos and Nigeria, including Mama Abibatu Mogaji, whose life reflected the strength and leadership of Lagos women as well as Brigadier-General Mobolaji Johnson, Alhaji Lateef Jakande, and Chief Michael Otedola.

== Prohibited items ==
Here is a list of prohibited items at the festival:

- Okada motorcycle taxis
- bicycles
- sandals
- Suku - a cornrowed hairstyle popular among the Yorubas, one that has the hair converge at the middle, then shoot upward, before tipping downward.
- smoking
- female with head tie or headgear or any covering of the head
- male with cap of any kind
- wearing of the Eyo costume overnight or to cross a river or lagoon.

The masquerades are known to beat people who use any of the prohibited items at sight with their staffs.

== Gallery ==
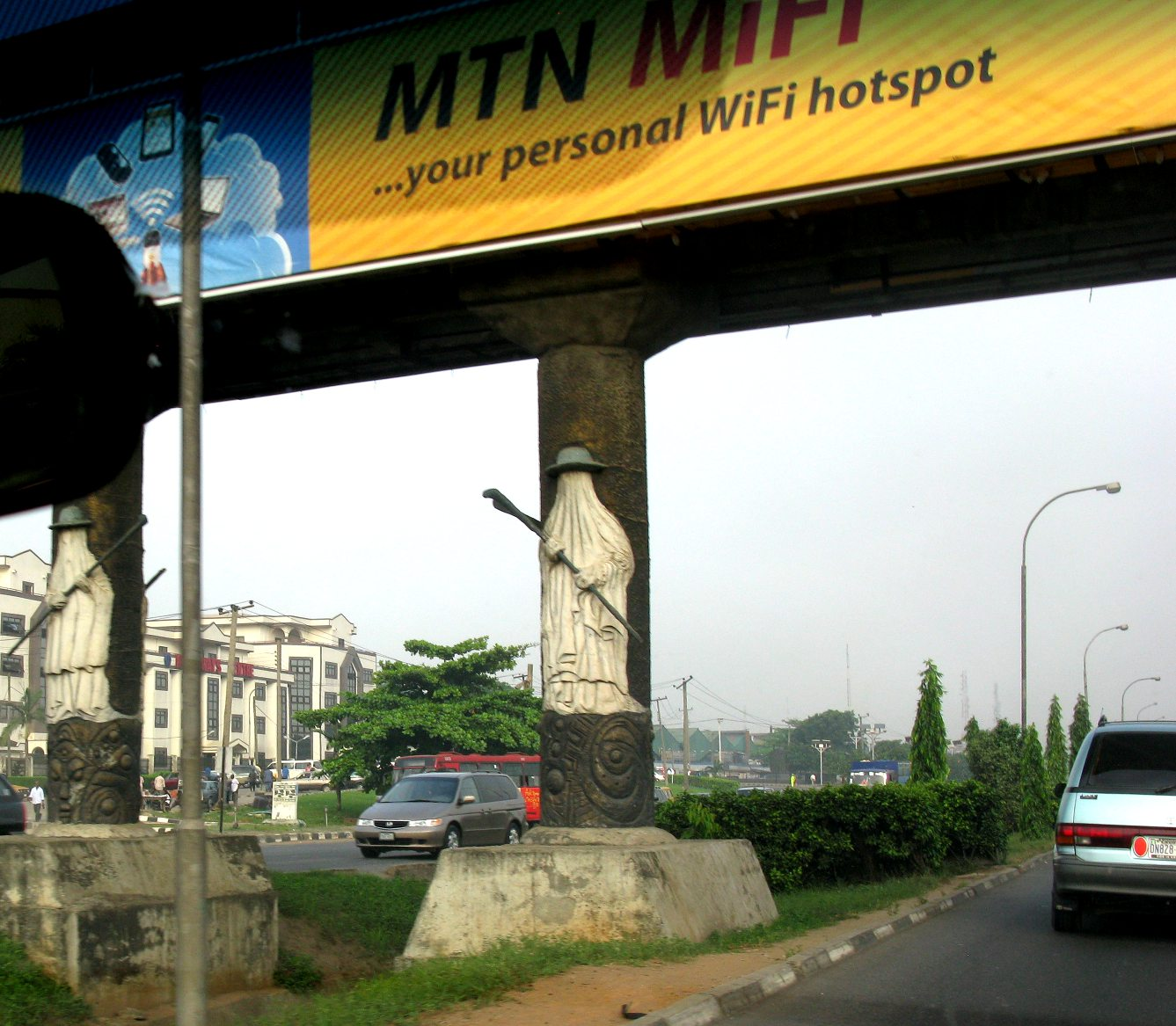
Bridge pillars in Lagos showing Eyo figures

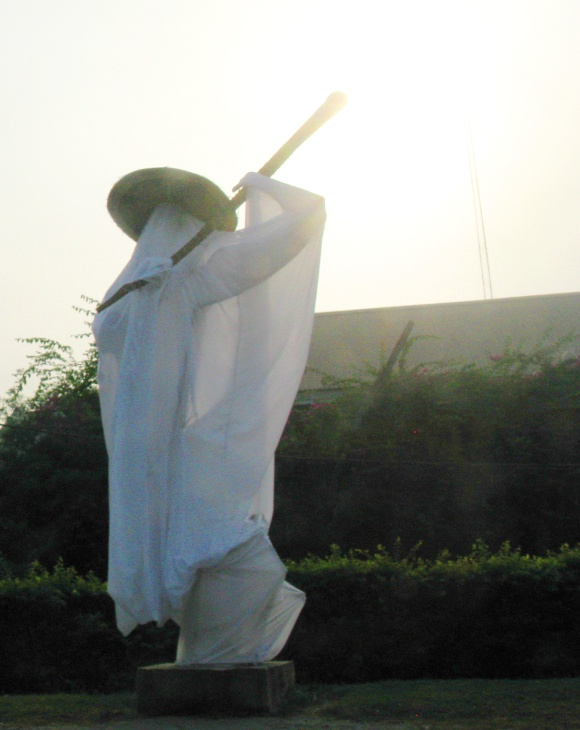
Eyo figure advertising upcoming festival

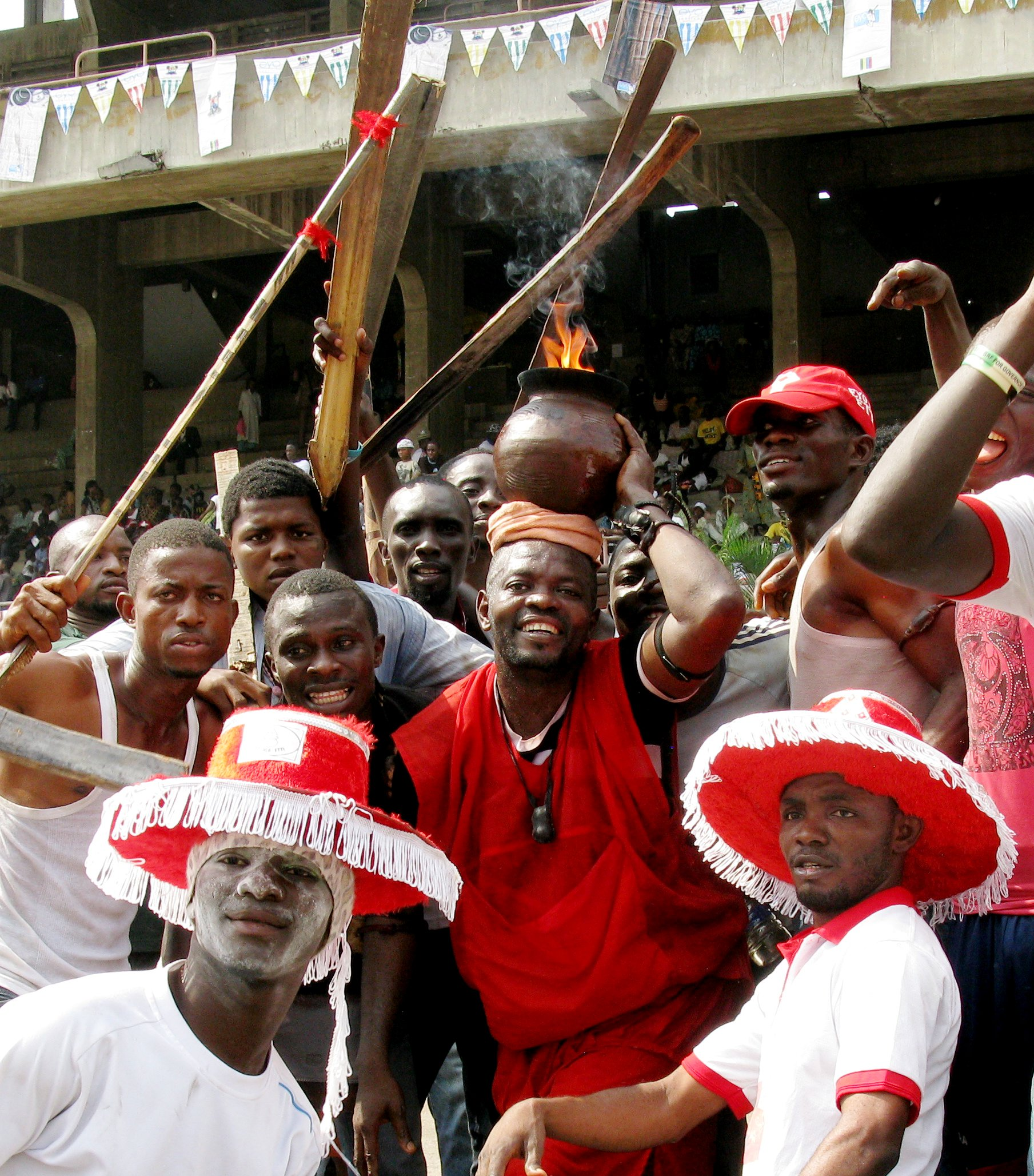
Members of the Eyo Iga Etti procession at the Eyo festival at Tafawa Balewa Square in Lagos, including a man carrying a burning pot on his head.

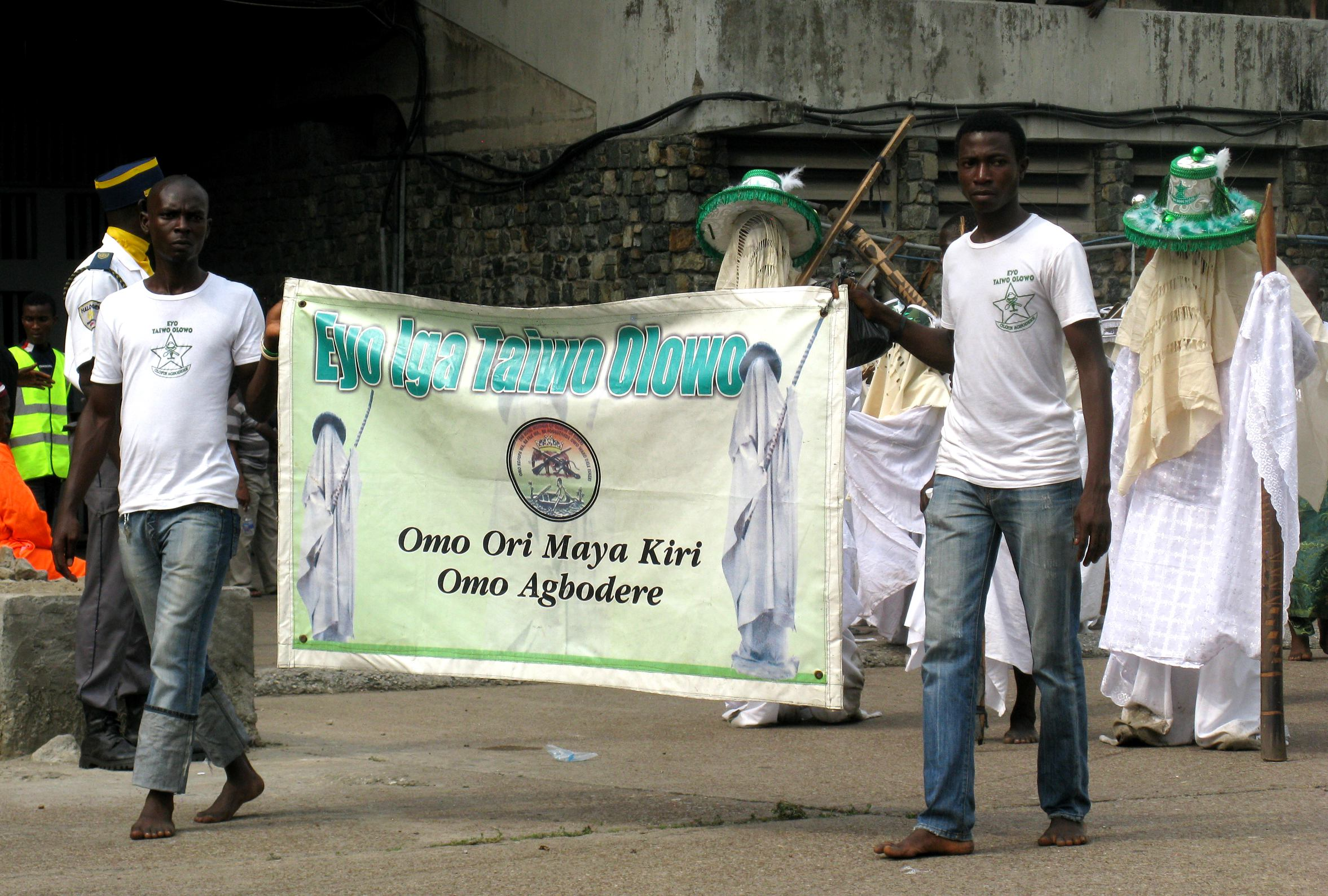
The banner of the Eyo Iga Taiwo Olowo entering the TBS.

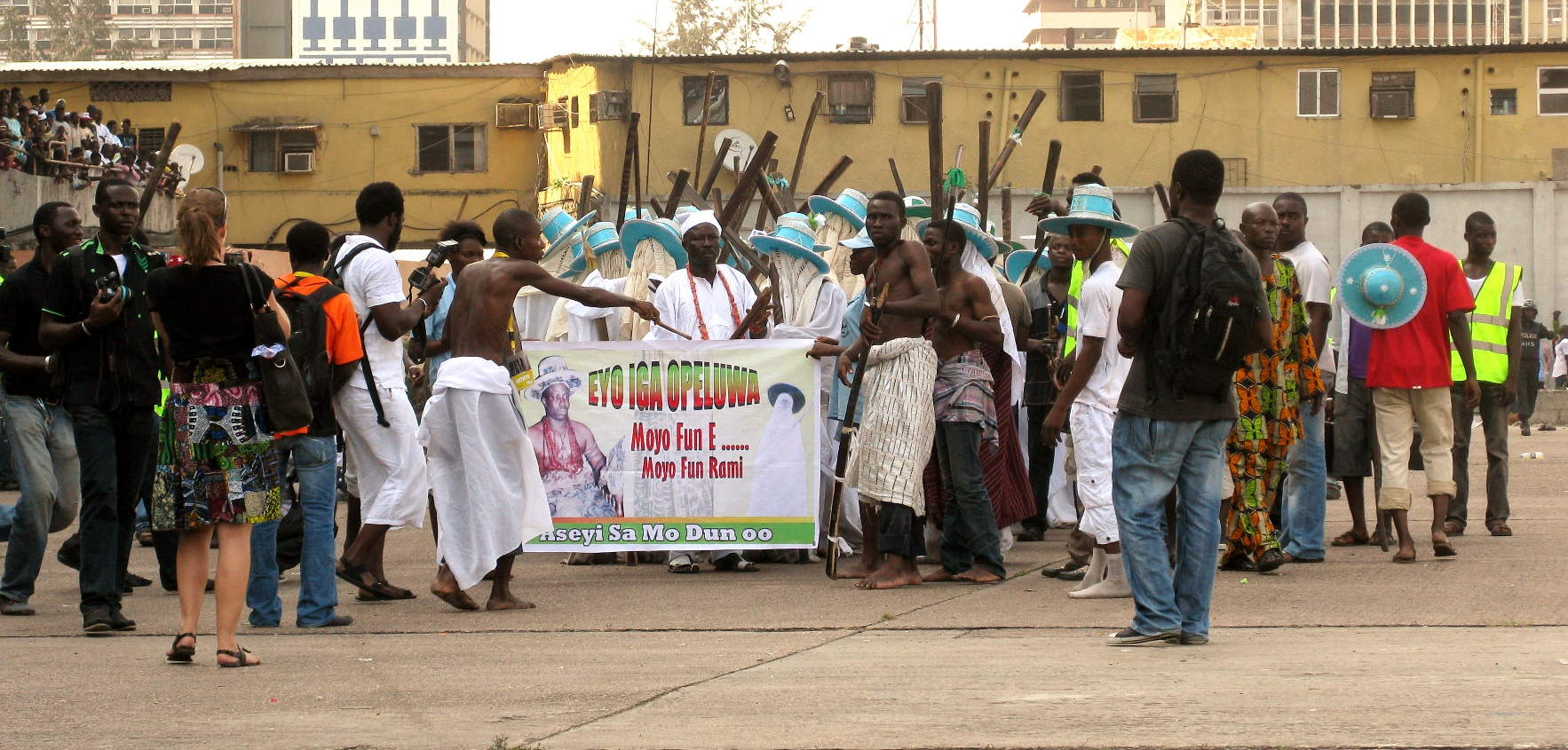
The banner of the Eyo Iga Opeluwa entering the TBS.

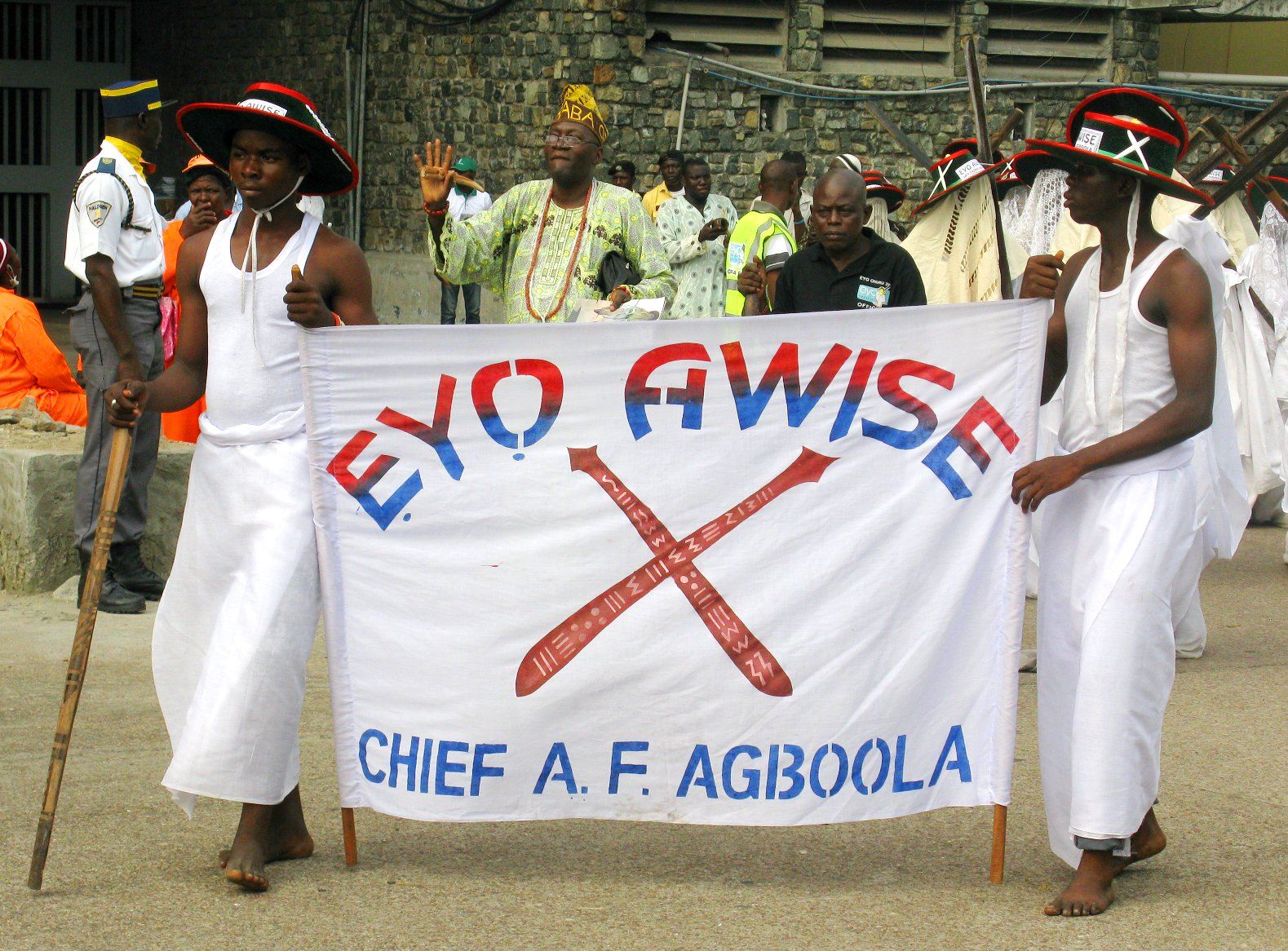
The banner of the Eyo Awise entering the TBS.

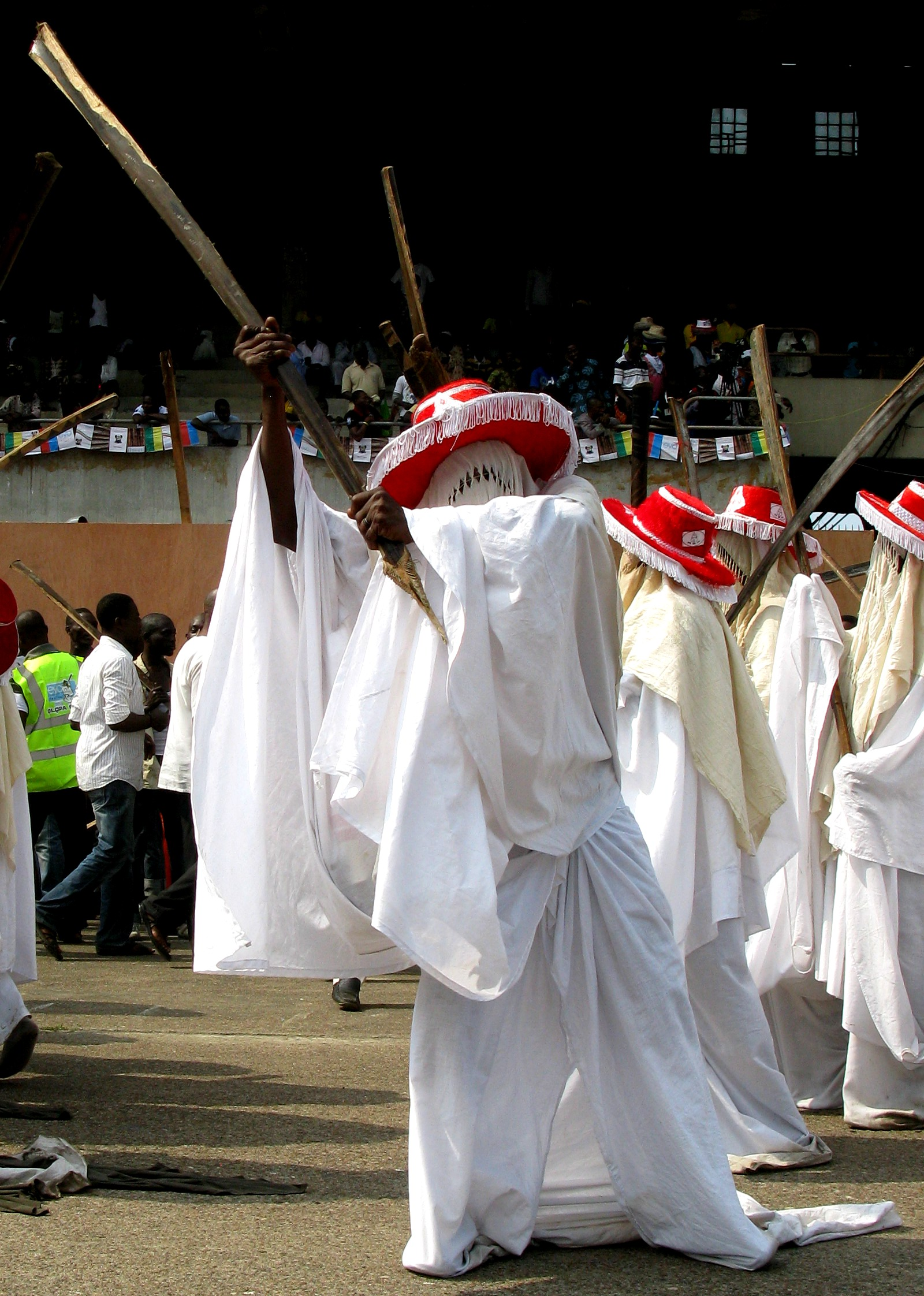
Masquerades in the Eyo Iga Etti procession.

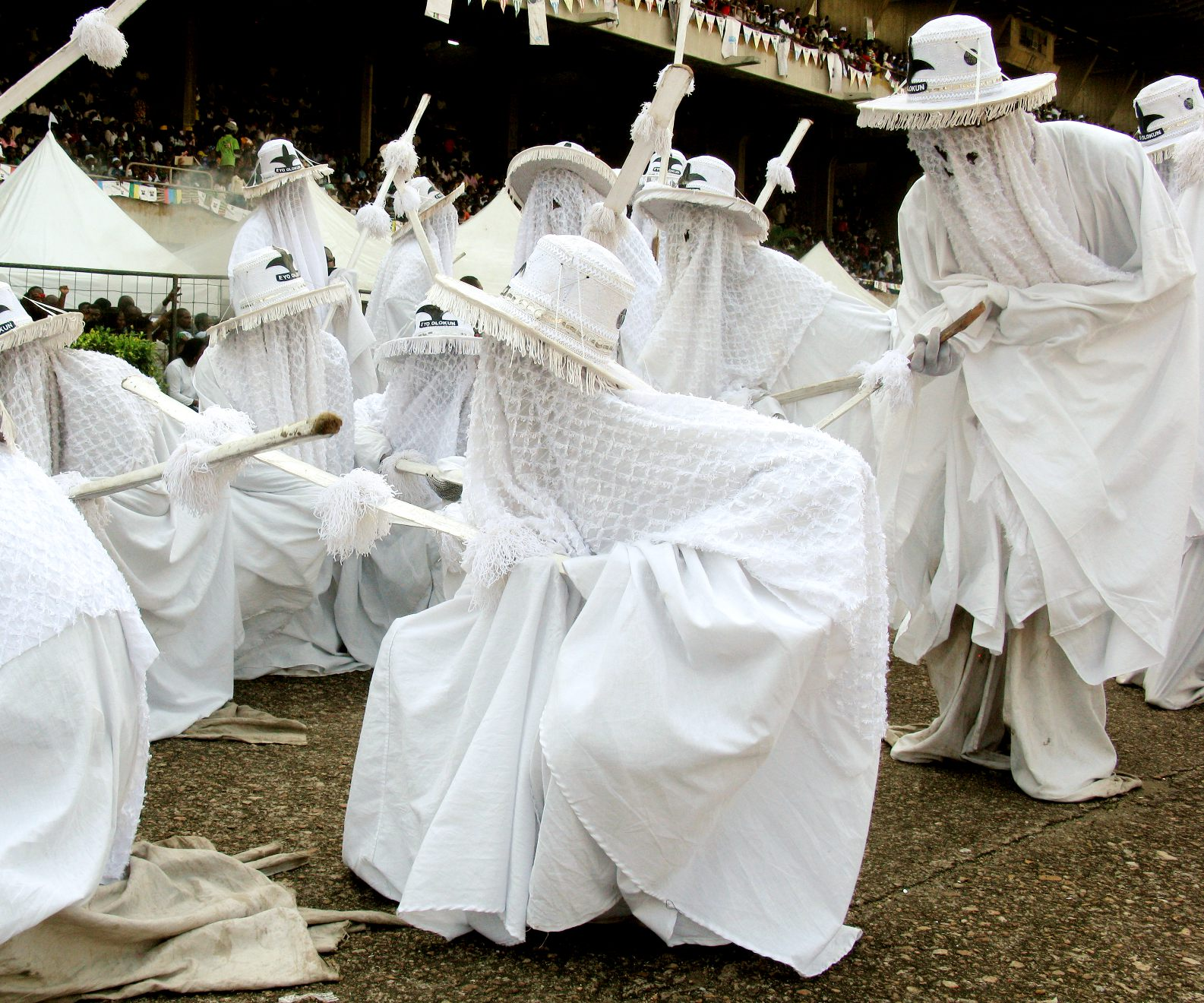
Eyo Olokun masquerades at the TBS. Eyo Olokun are connected with Olokun, the Yoruba deity of the sea.

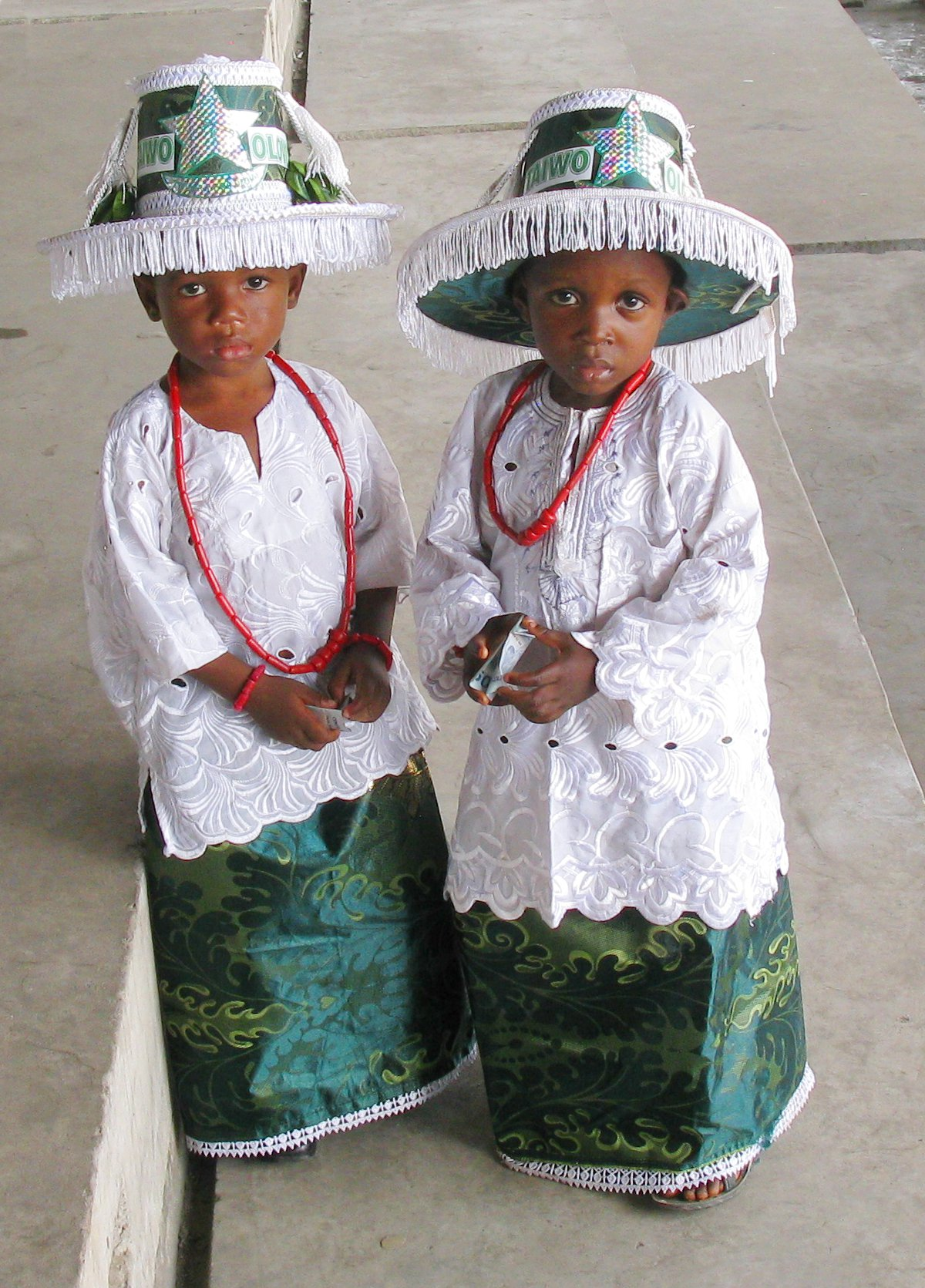
Children in costume at the festival.

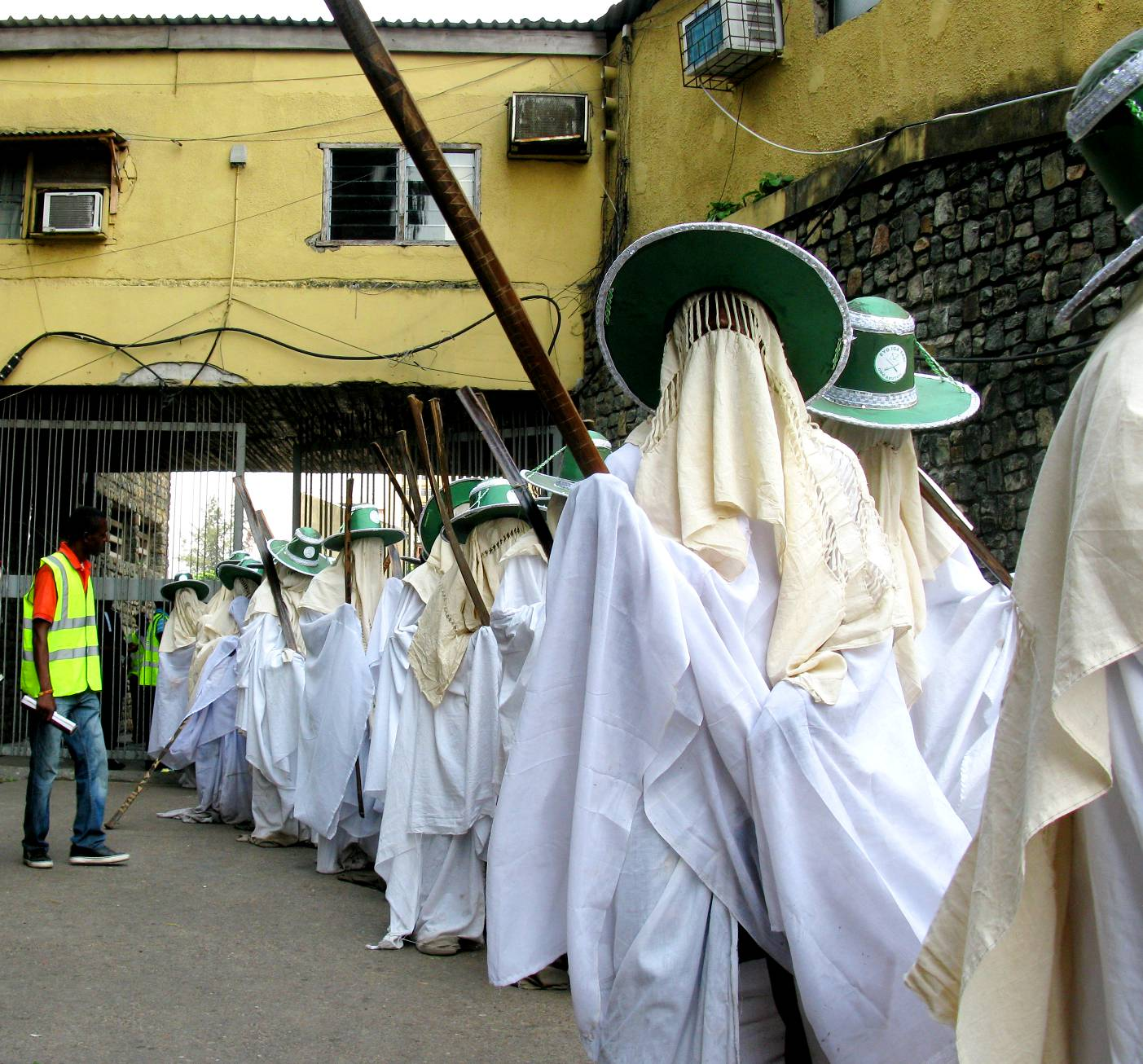
Masquerades of the Eyo Iga Sasi entering the TBS in Lagos in procession.

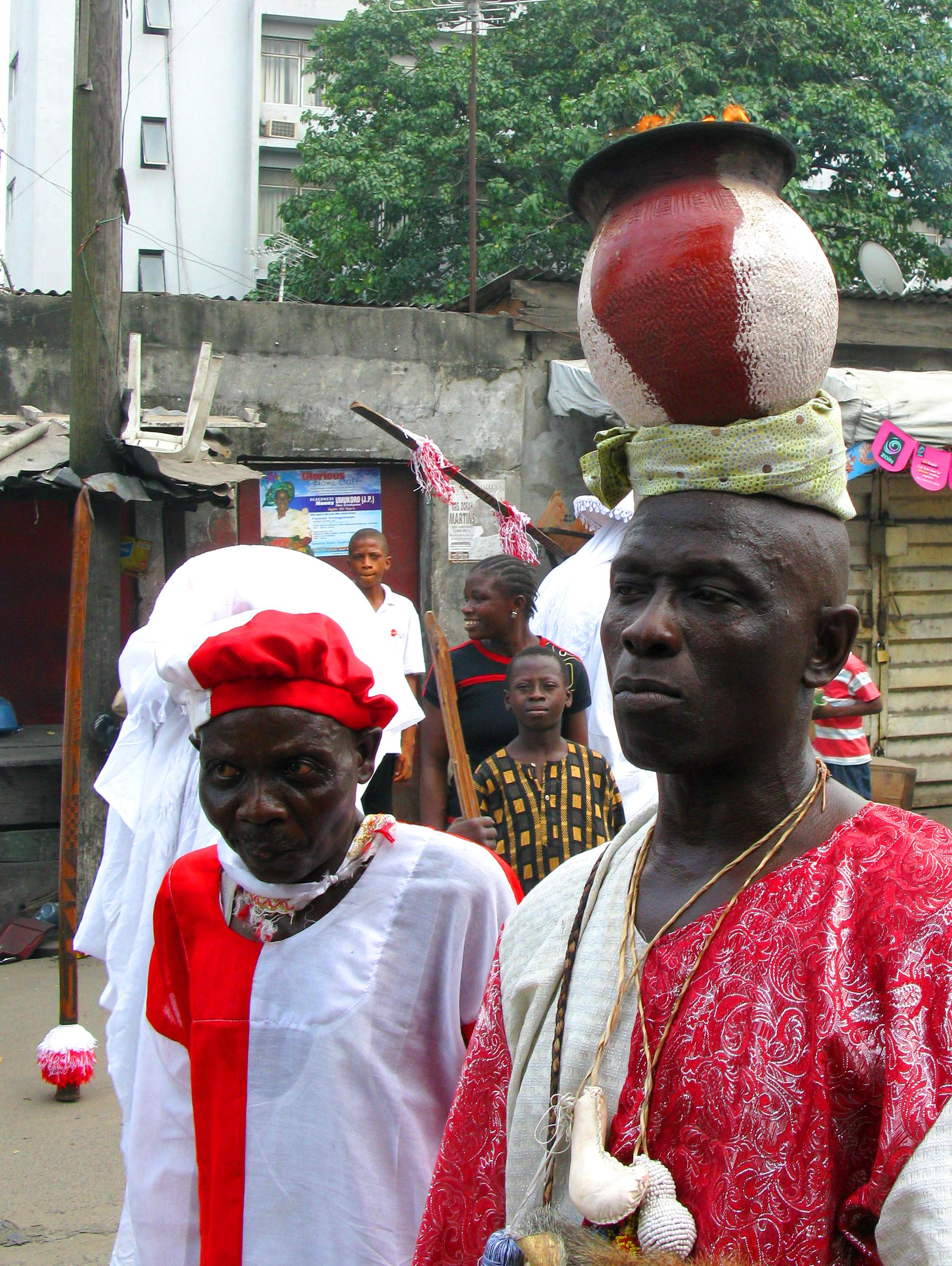
A man carrying a burning pot on his head as part of a procession in a residential area of Lagos. Probably a member of Eyo Iga Etti.

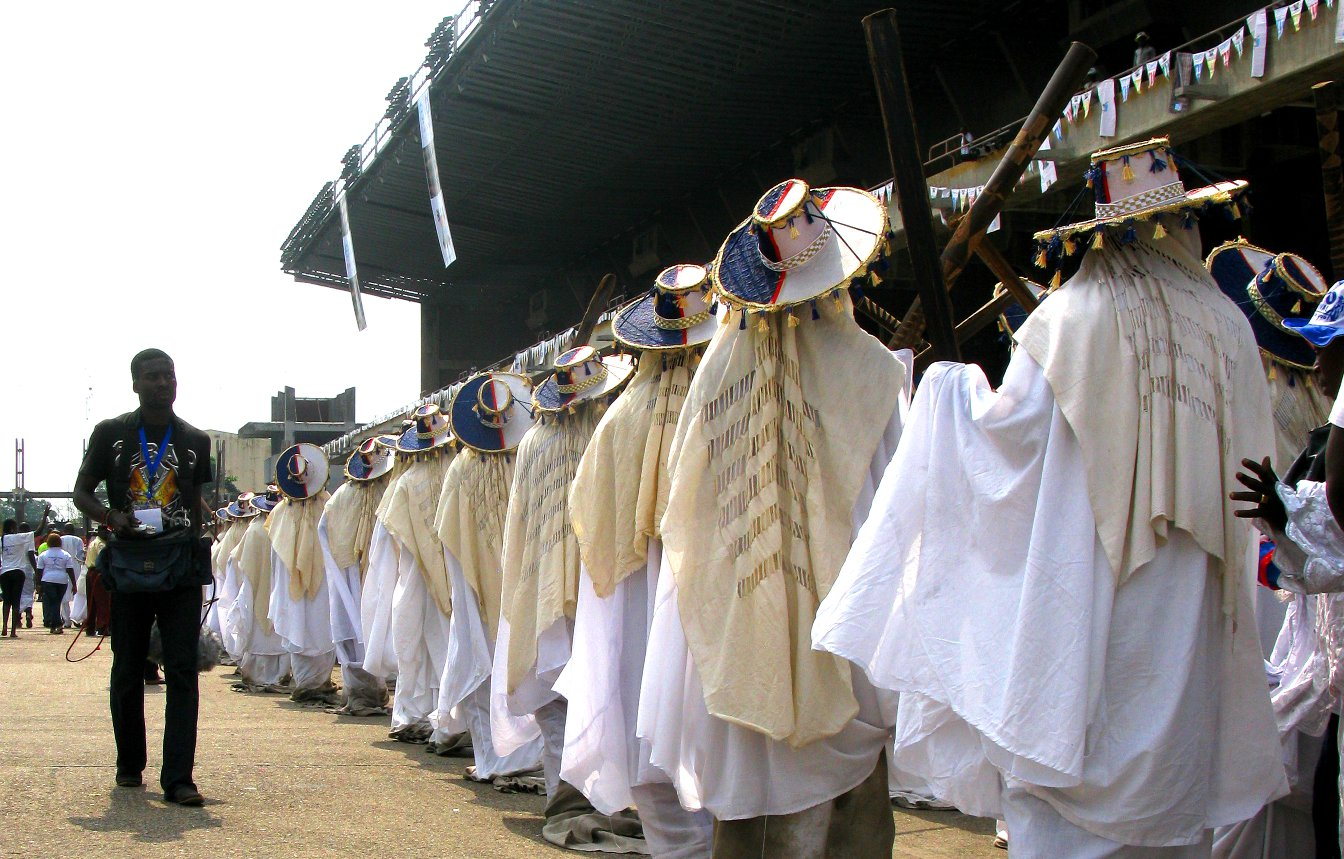
Masquerades of the Eyo Iga Faji parading in the TBS.

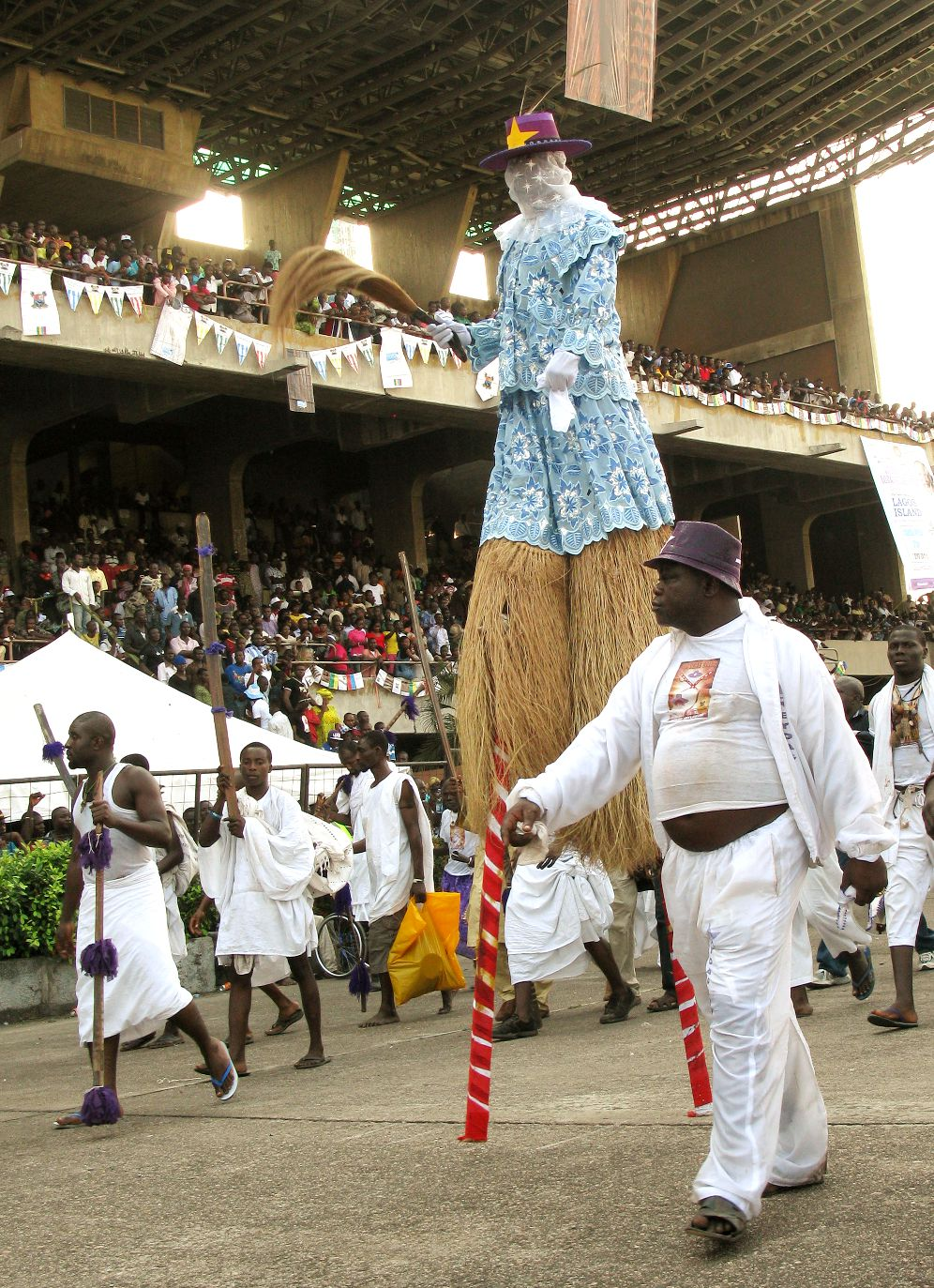
A performer on stilts as part of the Eyo Agere Molokun procession parading in the TBS.

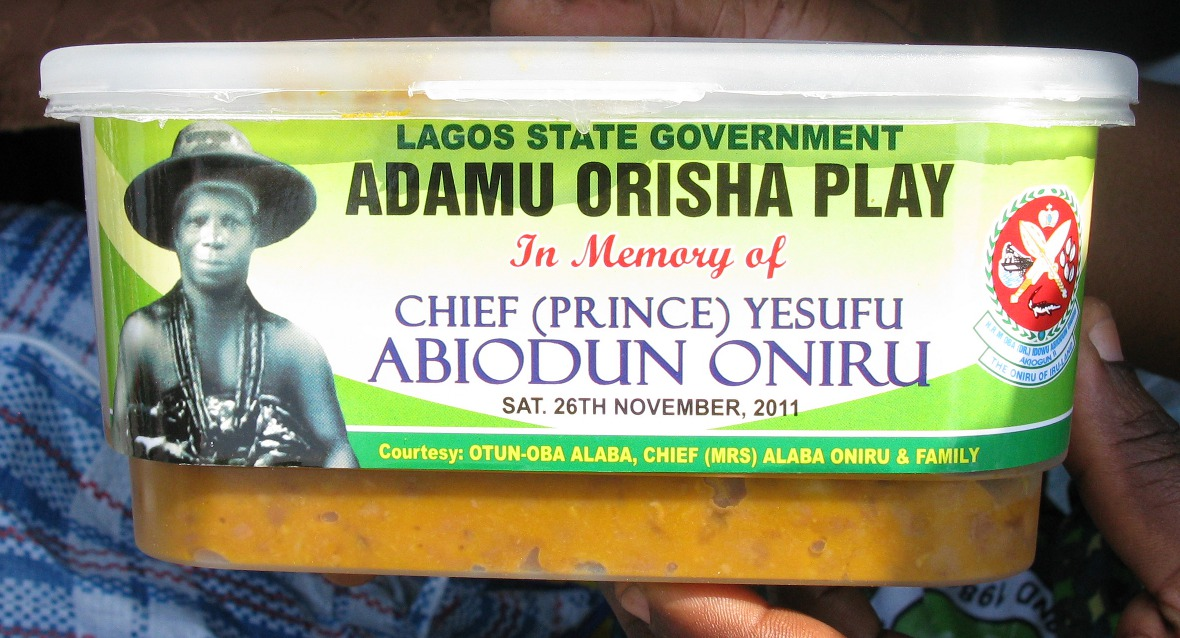
A packed lunch brought by the royal family for the 2011 Eyo festival, commemorating Prince Yesufu Abiodun Oniru.

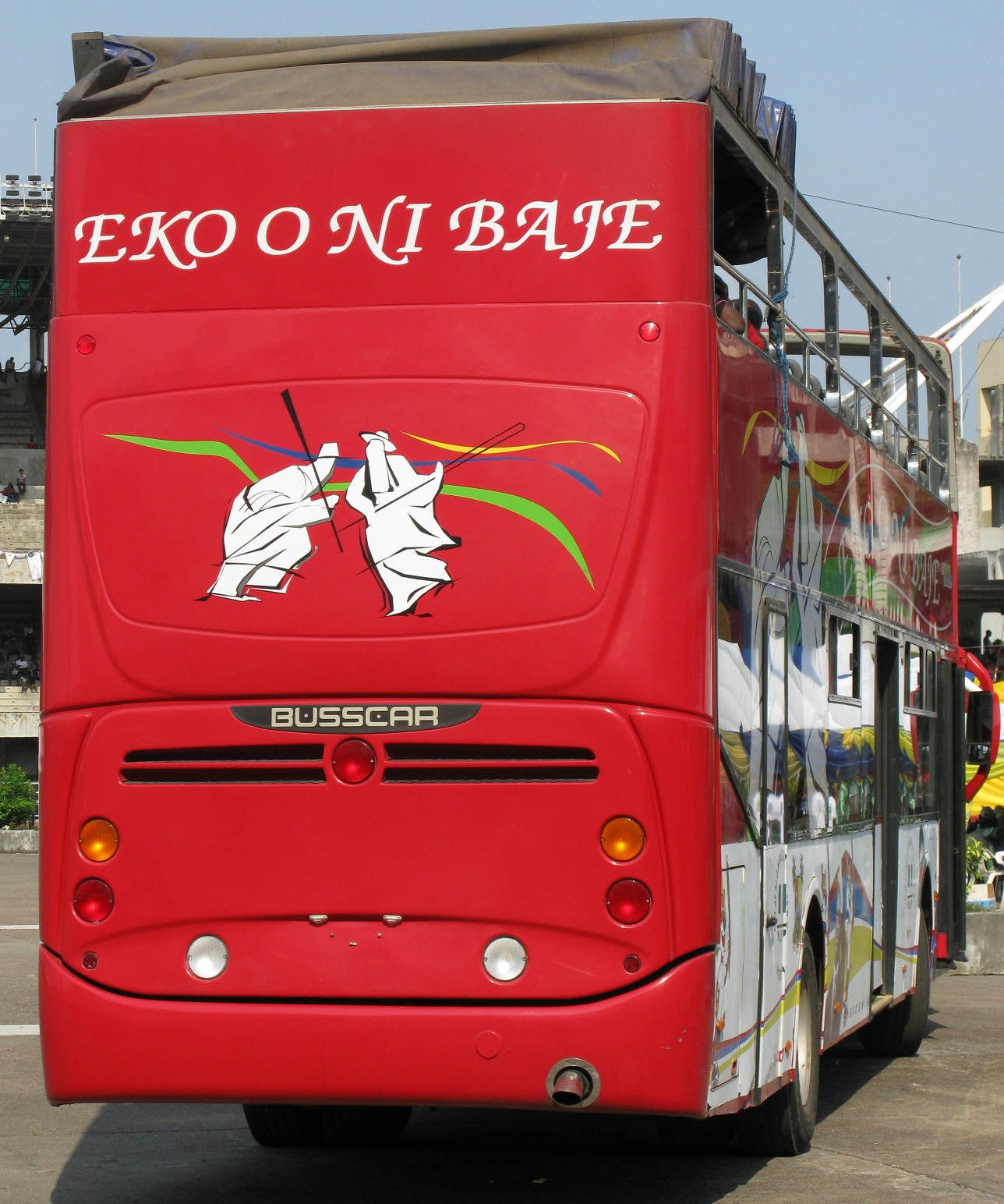
A bus with Eyo masquerades painted on the back, with the slogan "Eko o ni baje" (literally Lagos will not spoil, a colloquialism for Lagos will prevail).

== See also ==
- Festivals in Nigeria
