= Bane, Nigeria =

Town in Rivers state, Nigeria

Bane is a town in Ogoni territory of Rivers State, Nigeria. Located within the Ken-Khana kingdom, Bane was the birthplace of chief Jim Wiwa and forms the immediate eastern coastal boundaries between Rivers State and Akwa Ibom State. The main boundary that demarcates these two States is the Imo River on whose coastlines the town is conspicuously located. Bane's immediate neighbours on the other side of the Imo River are the Opobo and the Nkoro (Rivers State) and the Anaang (Akwa Ibom State).

== Geography ==
Bane covers an area of approximately 10 square kilometres (3.9 mi^{2}). Its topographical layout stands at about 100 metres (330 ft) above sea level. According to the Ordnance Survey Map of Rivers State (1980), Bane is positioned approximately on Latitude 4° 14 North and Longitude 3° 4 East. Bounded on the north are Eweh and Kwawa; Bere and Duburo on the east; and Buan and Kono to the west with the southern peripheries covered by the Imo River. By the 1973 National population census figures, the population of nine villages of Bane, excluding Kenwigbara, stood at about 8,500; one of the highest in the district.

== Governance ==
Bane Town consists of ten autonomous villages - Bara, Deewii, De, Gbor, Kenwigbara, Laba, Luumene, Mae, Maa-or, and Nyorzorgor; each village under the traditional leadership of a "Mene" (Chief). According to oral tradition, the historical intricacies surrounding the founding of Bane conceded the founding of the town to Gbene-Onye Sasabaa; a traditional honour that conferred on him the royal title of "Tẽ-ere Bue" and "Mene Bue" Bane. By this historical tradition, the Gbene-Onye's Family of Bara is the only family that can produce the paramount king (Mene Bue) for Bane Town.

== Language ==
The spoken language of the Bane people is Khana. However, Baneans speak a distinct aspect of the dialects of the Khana language. For example, Baneans use a consistent “I” - ikpotor (legs), ikpote (stick), ikpobari (piece of fish) as against the other dialectical variations - akpotor, ekpotor (legs), akpote, ekpote (stick), akpobari, ekpobari (piece of fish).

== Economy ==
Bane people practice an agro-based economy, sourcing water and food from the surround Imo and Niger rivers. Their traditional occupations are fishing and farming. Baneans specialise in breeding livestock, fishing, and food and cash crop production. They cultivate and grow cassava, yam, cocoyam, three-leave yam, maize, fruited pumpkin among others. They also breed goats and sheet in a process that allows goats and sheep to roam and feed on their own in morning and return to their pens in the evening. Fishing is done with nets, cooks and other fishing traps, known under the names gbee, gana, kὲrὲ, and kpor.

== Religion ==
Bane is a secular community governed by both traditional and Christian religious beliefs. Ancestral and deity shrines (Loò) and churches (Tor-Bari) can be found throughout the community. The Supreme Being, ancestors, gods, goddesses, land and water in the community are deified especially through yearly festivals such as De Bari (marking first-fruits harvest, dedicated to the Supreme Being), De Dua (New Yam Festival), and Tor-ziá and Christian celebrations like Easter and Christmas.

== Cultural festivals ==
Bane’s yearly festivals are held during yam harvest periods and at the beginning of every farming season. These festivals and celebrations are widely communal and family reunion-oriented. To mark the Dua Festival, yams are harvested and honoured (in form of libations) before powerful deities and in families. Masquerades like Miã, Tὲὲbee, Zim, Waalu, and Ikina, among others, are showcased to mark these events. Aside the Bari, Dua, and Tor-zia festivals, other festivals and celebrations are also held in the community. Some of these festivals and celebrations held to commemorate the founding of the town, to pay homage to a particular ancestral land, or ancestors, gods, goddesses, deities or spirits, or taking of titles and for entertainment.
