= Amnesty International UK Media Awards 1996 =

Six awards were awarded in the categories: National Print; Periodicals; Photojournalism; Radio; Television Documentary; and Television News.

The award ceremony, held on Wednesday 19 June 1996, was hosted by Shahnaz Pakravan.

The overall winners were The News Team at ITN Channel 4 for their coverage of "War Crimes in Bosnia". The overall award was presented by Ken Wiwa.

Marc Jobst said: "I'm enormously proud to receive this award from Amnesty International because I have such respect for their work. The programme they awarded was about Dana Tep and her daughter Ramoni who were subjected to slavery under the Khmer Rouge."

Dana and Ramoni Tep received a standing ovation at the ceremony, as they bravely chose the occasion of the AIUK Press Awards to come out from years of hiding to reveal their true identities.

== 1996 Awards ==
1996
Category	Title	Organisation	Journalists	Refs
National Print
National Print	Series of articles reporting the Fall of Srebrenica	The Independent	Robert Block	
Periodicals
Periodicals	"Death of a Village"	Newsweek	Rod Nordland	
Photojournalism
Photojournalism	Photograph of an eight-year-old victim of a land mine accident in Kabul		Theodore Liasi	
Radio
Radio	"Out of the Fire"	BBC Radio 4	Marc Jobst, Shirley Pope, John Simpson	
Television; Documentary
Television; Documentary	"Delta Force"	A Catma Films production for Channel Four	Glenn Ellis	
Television; News
Television; News	Series of reports on "War Crimes in Bosnia"	Channel Four News	ITN Channel Four News team	
