= Trans Wonderland =

Amusement park in Ibadan, Nigeria

- Interactive map of Trans Wonderland
- Location: Ibadan, Nigeria
- Coordinates: 7.432665°N 3.909791°E
- Opened: November 29, 1989
- Operating season: Year-round
- Area: 27 ha (67 acres)

Trans Wonderland (also known as the Trans Amusement Park) was an amusement and theme park in Ibadan, Nigeria.

== History ==
The Trans Wonderland project was initiated in 1987 by the incumbent military Governor at the time: colonel Adetunji Olurin, while construction of the park began in August 1988, following the financial support from the subsequent Governor, Colonel Sasaenia Adedeji Oresanya. The park opened to the public on November 29, 1989.

== Attractions ==
Trans Wonderland is sometimes referred to as Nigeria's Disney World. The park covers a total area of 27 ha (67 acres).

Attractions included roller coasters, electronic bumper cars, panoramic wheels, ferris wheels, merry-go-round horses, space station, flying chain chairs, dragon boats, funky basket circles and many others. Before its closure, the park was a shadow of its former self because many of the attractions had fallen into disrepair and were no longer in good working condition due to maintenance issues. In spite of this, the park had been a popular entertainment venue in Ibadan.

== Closure ==
In an official newsletter on the 21st of September, 2023, the Oyo State Governor, Seyi Makinde announced his plans to convert the amusement park into a housing project, citing a lack of interest from private sector collaborators due to obsolete equipment and problems with building a more modern park at the same location as reasons for the decision to utilise the land for a housing project. He also added that the revenue from the housing project would be used to develop the state further, and that a new modern amusement park would be constructed at the Ilutuntun Business District through a PPP collaboration.

This announcement was met with displeasure from various sources, with some calling it an extinction and a coalition of child-focused NGOs stating that the demolition of the amusement park would deprive children of their rights to leisure and recreation.

== In popular culture ==
The theme park is the eponymous title of the 2012 travel book by Noo Saro-Wiwa, Looking for Transwonderland.
