= Ogoni people =

Ethnic group in Rivers State, Nigeria

Ogoni
- Ogoni flag designed by MOSOP

Total population
- Over 2,000,000 and lays claims to the single largest ethnic group in Rivers State Nigeria. 500,000 (1963 census).

Regions with significant populations
- Nigeria

Languages
- Ogoni languages

Religion
- Traditional beliefs, Christianity

Related ethnic groups
- Ibibio, Igbo, Ikwere, Ijaw, Efik, Ejagham, Bahumono, Ukelle people, Annang, Oron, Korring

The Ogoni are an ethnic group located in Rivers South-East senatorial district of Rivers State, in the Niger Delta region of southern Nigeria. They number just over 2 million and live in a 1,050-square-kilometre (404-square-mile) homeland which they also refer to as Ogoniland. They share common oil-related environmental problems with the Ijaw people of the Niger Delta.

The Ogoni rose to international attention after a massive public protest campaign against Shell Oil, led by the Movement for the Survival of the Ogoni People (MOSOP), which is also a member of the Unrepresented Nations and Peoples Organization (UNPO).

== Geography ==
Location of the Ogoni people, marked in yellow.

The territory is located in Rivers State near the coast of the Gulf of Guinea, east of the city of Port Harcourt, and bounded by the Imo River on the north and east. It extends across four Local Government Areas (LGAs) of Khana, Gokana,Tai and Eleme and, arguably, but not certain Oyigbo. Ogoniland is divided into the six kingdoms: Babbe, Gokana, Ken-Khana, Nyo-Khana, Tai and Eleme. Nyo-Khana is on the East while Ken-Khana is on the west. The physicality of the land is most akin to a plateau, sloping up to about one hundred feet above sea level at its maximum height. June, July, and September are the wettest months of the year, averaging about 178 inches of rainfall, and the driest months are December through February, averaging between one and five inches of rain. Along with the precipitation, the highest temperatures average around 32.3 °C (90.2 °F) in February, and the lowest are 27.9 °C (82.3 °F).

== Languages ==
There are multiple languages spoken by the Ogonis. The largest is Khana, which is mutually intelligible with the dialects of the other kingdoms, Gokana, Tai (Tẹẹ), Eleme, and Baen Ogoi, part of the linguistic diversity of the Niger Delta.

== History ==
According to oral tradition, the Ogoni people migrated from ancient Ghana down to the Atlantic coast, eventually making their way over to the eastern Niger Delta region and getting absorbed into the already existing Ibibio, Annang, Igbo, and Ijaw population. The name "Ogoni" originated from the Ibani/Ijaw word- Igoni, which means strangers.

People on the Guinea coast, the Ogonis have an internal political structure subject to community-by-community arrangement, including appointment of chiefs and community development bodies, some recognized by the government and others not. They survived the period of the slave trade in relative isolation and did not lose any of their members to enslavement. After Nigeria was colonized by the British in 1885, British soldiers arrived in Ogoni by 1901. Major resistance to their presence continued through 1914.

The Ogoni were integrated into a succession of economic systems at a pace that was extremely rapid and exacted a great toll from them. At the turn of the twentieth century, “the world to them did not extend beyond the next three or four villages”, but that soon changed. Ken Saro-Wiwa, the late president of MOSOP, described the transition this way: “if you then think that within the space of seventy years they were struck by the combined forces of modernity, colonialism, the money economy, indigenous colonialism and then the Nigerian Civil War, and that they had to adjust to these forces without adequate preparation or direction, you will appreciate the bafflement of the Ogoni people and the subsequent confusion engendered in the society.”

=== Nationalism ===
Ogoni Flag designed by the M.O.S.O.P.

Ogoni nationalism is a political ideology that seeks self determination by the Ogoni people. The Ogonis are one of the many indigenous peoples in the region of southeast Nigeria. They number about 1.5 million people and live in a 404-square-mile (1,050 km^{2}) homeland which they also refer to as Ogoni, or Ogoniland. They share common oil-related environmental problems with the Ijaw people of Niger Delta.

The Ogoni rose to international attention after a massive public protest campaign against Shell Oil, led by the Movement for the Survival of the Ogoni People (MOSOP). MOSOP's mandated use of non-violent methods to promote democratic principles assist Ogoni people pursue rights of self-determination in environmental issues in the Niger Delta, cultural rights and practices for Ogoni people.

== Culture ==
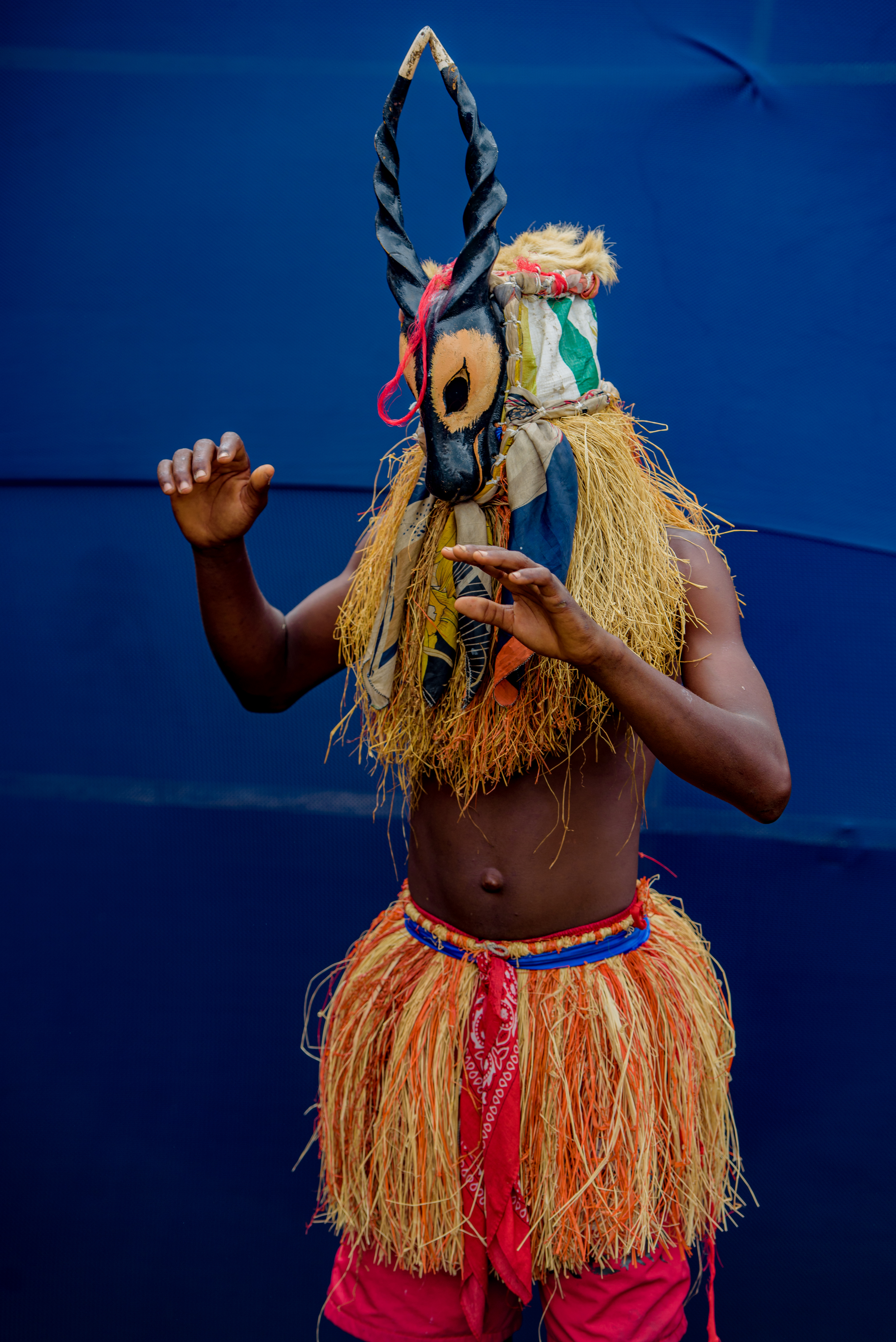
Akarikpo mask.

According to Ogoni tradition, the world was created by a supreme female god named Bari (or Wa-Bari, Kara-Bari). Before the colonization of Nigeria in the 19th century, every aspect of life revolved around this god, who lived in the skies, and consulted via shrines to help with earthly issues. Death is seen as a transition to the spirit world, but is also seen as unnatural, as they believe it is caused by evil spirits called Taa (alternate names: Poro-Edon, Yo). The climate and agriculture is suitable for plants and trees like palms, yams, and assorted fruits and vegetables, allowing for them to have their main production, palm oil, and create jobs.

=== Art ===
The art of the Ogoni people is crucial to their community, sharing cultural similarities with their geographical neighbors, the Igbo, Ibibo, Efik, and Ijaw cultures. Wooden sculptures are their most prominent way of expression. Masks, human figures, puppets, and ornate headdresses are made, usually depicting or paying homage to ancestral spirits but can still be secular. Dances and masquerades are also used for the full performance of said masks and headdresses, adding more complexity and emotion to the art form with fully articulated limbs and raffia clothing. These performances are sponsored by the Amanikpo and Karikpo societies, who also performed with full-figure puppets with the intention of promoting fertility and dispelling evil spirits. Masks with grotesque appearances were also used for regulatory roles. These dances are influenced by their environment and are interpreted into their dance routines.

The Ogoni have a distinct style for their masks in particular, developed through their own carving tradition. The human-like varieties include, but are not limited to, an overall small head, hinged jaws, and white or brown pigment, especially around the eyes, and range from graceful and elegant to unrefined and grotesque. These masks do not cover the face entirely and come in a variety of mounts. Other masks include representations of animals, large, grotesque depictions of restless spirits, and real people of high status.

== Human rights violations ==
The Ogoni people have been victims of various human rights violations for many years. In 1956, four years before Nigerian Independence, Royal Dutch/Shell, in collaboration with the British government, found a commercially viable oil field on the Niger Delta and began oil production in 1958. In a 15-year period from 1976 to 1991 there were reportedly 2,976 oil spills of about 2.1 million barrels of oil in Ogoniland, accounting for about 40% of the total oil spills of the Royal Dutch/Shell company worldwide.

In 1990, under the leadership of activist and environmentalist Ken Saro-Wiwa, the Movement of the Survival of the Ogoni People (MOSOP) planned to take action against the Federal Republic of Nigeria and the oil companies. In October 1990, MOSOP presented The Ogoni Bill of Rights to the government. The Bill hoped to gain political and economic autonomy for the Ogoni people, leaving them in control of the natural resources of Ogoniland protecting against further land degradation. The movement lost steam in 1994 after Saro-Wiwa and several other MOSOP leaders were executed by the Nigerian government.

In 1993, following protests that were designed to stop contractors from laying a new pipeline for Shell, the Mobile Police raided the area to quell the unrest. In the chaos that followed, it has been alleged that 27 villages were raided, resulting in the death of 2,000 Ogoni people and displacement of 80,000.

=== Environmental restoration ===
In a 2011 assessment of over 200 locations in Ogoniland by the United Nations Environment Programme (UNEP), they found that impacts of the 50 years of oil production in the region extended deeper than previously thought. Because of oil spills, oil flaring, and waste discharge, the alluvial soil of the Niger Delta is no longer viable for agriculture. Furthermore, in many areas that seemed to be unaffected, groundwater was found to have high levels of hydrocarbons or were contaminated with benzene, a carcinogen, at 900 levels above WHO guidelines.

UNEP estimated that it could take up to 30 years to rehabilitate Ogoniland to its full potential and that the first five years of rehabilitation would require funding of about US$1 billion. In 2012, the Nigerian Minister of Petroleum Resources, Deizani Alison-Madueke, announced the establishment of the Hydrocarbon Pollution Restoration Project, which intends to follow the UNEP report suggestions of Ogoniland to prevent further degradation.

A trial project in the region was able to achieve mangrove restoration in one of the significant waterways Bodo Creek which helped improve soil and water quality. After extensive remediation and mangrove restoration work by HYPREP, the Ogoni Mangrove Wetland was designated a Ramsar site in 2026 by the Convention on Wetlands.

== Notable people ==
- Timothy Paul Birabi, Nationalist & Elder Statesman
- Ken Saro-Wiwa, environmental activist, writer, and television producer
- Jim Wiwa, renowned Ogoni chief
- Lorraine Birabil, politician & Attorney
- John Noble Barinyima, Enyimba and Super Eagles goalkeeper
- Joseph Yobo, former professional footballer, captain, and current assistant coach of the Super Eagles
- Lee Maeba, Politician
- Owens Wiwa, Nigerian activist
- Muekara Monday, Environmental Advocate, Wildlife Conservationist, Ecosystem Restorer, and Entrepreneur
- Magnus L. Kpakol, former Chief Economic Adviser to the President of Nigeria, former Project Coordinator NAPEP.
- Fred Kpakol, Former Commissioner, Rivers State Ministry of Finance and Rivers State Ministry of Agriculture respectively.
- Kenneth Kobani, Former Minister of State, Trade and Commerce, Nigeria and Secretary to Government of Rivers State
- Ken Wiwa, Journalist & Writer
- Magnus Ngei Abe, Former Senator representing Rivers south-east senatorial district 2011-2019 and the March 18th 2023 Rivers State Gubernatorial Candidate under Social Democratic Party (Nigeria)
- Noo Saro-Wiwa, British-Nigerian author
- Barry Mpigi, Politician
- Dum Dekor, Member House of Representatives, National Assembly (Nigeria) Khana/Gokhana Constituency
- Zina Saro-Wiwa, Artist & Filmmaker

== Notes ==
=== References ===
- Brosnahan, L.F. 1967. A word list of the Gokana dialect of Ogoni. Journal of West African Languages, 143-52.
- Hyman, L.M. 1982. The representation of nasality in Gokana. In: The structure of phonological representations. ed. H. van der Hulst & Norval Smith. 111–130. Dordrecht: Foris.
- Hyman, L.M. 1983. Are there syllables in Gokana? In: Current issues in African linguistics, 2. Kaye et al. 171–179. Dordrecht: Foris.
- Ikoro, S.M. 1989. Segmental phonology and lexicon of Proto-Keggoid. University of Port Harcourt: M.A. thesis.
- Ikoro, S.M. 1996. The Kana language. Leiden: CNWS.
- Jeffreys, M.D.W. 1947. Ogoni Pottery. Man, 47: 81–83.
- Piagbo, B.S. 1981. A comparison of the sounds of English and Kana. B.A. project, University of Port Harcourt.
- Thomas, N.W. 1914. Specimens of languages from Southern Nigeria. London: Harrison & Sons.
- Vopnu, S.K. 1991. Phonological Processes and Syllable Structures in Gokana. M.A. Department of Linguistics and Nigerian Languages, University of Port Harcourt.
- Vọbnu, S.K. 2001. Origin and languages of Ogoni people. Boori, KHALGA: Ogoni Languages and Bible Center.
- Williamson, K. 1985. How to become a Kwa language. In Linguistics and Philosophy. Essays in Honor of Ruben S. Wells. eds. A. Makkai and A. Melby. Current Issues in Linguistic Theory, 42. Benjamins, Amsterdam.
- Wolff, H. 1959. Niger Delta languages I: classification. Anthropological Linguistics, 1(8):32–35.
- Wolff, H. 1964. Synopsis of the Ogoni languages. Journal of African languages, 3:38–51.
- Zua, B.A. 1987. The noun phrase in Gokana. B.A. project, University of Port Harcourt.
