= The Atlantic Sound =

Travelogue by Caryl Phillips

- Author: Caryl Phillips
- Publisher: Faber and Faber
- Publication date: 2000
- Publication place: United Kingdom

The Atlantic Sound is a 2000 travel book by Caryl Phillips. It was published in the UK by Faber and Faber and in the US by Knopf. In the words of the Publishers Weekly review: "Journeys, as forces of spiritual and cultural transformation, bind this trio of nonfiction narratives, which explores the legacy of slavery in each of the three major points of the transatlantic slave trade."

Geoffrey Moorhouse, assessing the book for The New York Times, wrote: "Caryl Phillips was born in St. Kitts, but he's been an Englishman almost from the start, and has since become nearly as much at home in New York as he is in London. He is uncommonly well placed, therefore, to ponder the relationship between people of his own ancestry and those of Europe and North America, as well as that which has lately and self-consciously been pursued by black Americans and West Indians anxious to reclaim their stake in Africa. Because he's a writer and not an academic or a polemicist, he has done this lyrically in The Atlantic Sound, with an extremely balanced assessment divided into five episodes, each casting further light on the intricate patterns and prejudices of race."

Exploring what constitutes "home", Phillips repeats a journey he made as a child in the late 1950s on a banana boat from the Caribbean to Britain, then visits three cities pivotal to the African diaspora: Liverpool in England, where many ships involved in the triangular trade departed; Elmina on the coast of Ghana, site of the most important slave fort in Africa; and Charleston in the US south, where one-third of African Americans were landed and sold into bondage, and where Phillips makes a pilgrimage to Magnolia Cemetery to lay flowers at the grave of Julius Waties Waring, a white judge who played an important role in the early legal battles of the American Civil Rights Movement. Writing in The Guardian, reviewer Maya Jaggi notes: "It is characteristic of Phillips's vision that, in excavating the hidden history of this antebellum tourist centre, he draws imaginative links between diasporic wanderers and a white man whose moral stand made him an outcast in his own hometown."

The book was described by Kirkus Reviews as: "A splendidly honest and vividly detailed venture into some of history's darkest corners—by a novelist who is also a superb reporter." Comparisons have been drawn between this work and Looking for Transwonderland, by Nigerian writer Noo Saro-Wiwa.
