= Ogoni nationalism =

Political ideology in Nigeria

Ogoni Flag designed by the M.O.S.O.P.

Ogoni nationalism is a political ideology that seeks self determination by the Ogoni people. The Ogonis are one of the many indigenous peoples in the region of southeast Nigeria. They number about 1.5 million people and live in a 404-square-mile (1,050 km^{2}) homeland which they also refer to as Ogoni, or Ogoniland. They share common oil-related environmental problems with the Ijaw people of Niger Delta.

The Ogoni rose to international attention after a massive public protest campaign against Shell Oil, led by the Movement for the Survival of the Ogoni People (MOSOP). MOSOP's mandated use of non-violent methods to promote democratic principles assist Ogoni people pursue rights of self-determination in environmental issues in the Niger Delta, cultural rights and practices for Ogoni people.
