= Timothy Paul Birabi =

Nigerian nationalist and politician

Rt Hon. Timothy Paul Birabi FRGS
- Born: 19 October 1916 (age 109); Nigeria
- Education: University of Southampton
- Spouse: Victoria Birabi

Timothy Naakuu Paul Birabi (1916–1953) popularly known as TNP Birabi was a Nigerian nationalist and politician widely considered the father of modern Ogoniland.

== Education ==
Birabi studied geography and mathematics at the University of Southampton. He was awarded fellow of the Royal Geographical Society in 1948. Birabi was the first University graduate from Ogoniland and was instrumental in the educational development of Ogoni people during the pre-independence era.

== Political career ==
Hon. Birabi was elected to the House of Representatives (Nigeria) under the National Council of Nigeria and the Cameroons. He was part of the delegation that attended the London Constitutional conference in 1953 to negotiate the independence of Nigeria from Great Britain.

== Death ==
Birabi died in 1953 shortly after returning from the London conference. Nigeria's first president Nnamdi Azikiwe paid tribute to him at his funeral ceremony remarking "Nigeria has lost a worthy son and Ogoni nation has lost a sun".

== Honours ==
His centenary of birth was marked with a grand candle night memorial with a march of over 20000 people from across the Niger Delta from his grave side at Yeghe to Bori (Yeghe) on the night of 29 November, 2016 which marked the beginning of an annual candle night memorial. Birabi street in New GRA, Port Harcourt and the Birabi Memorial Grammar School in Bori City are named after him.

== Personal life ==
Birabi was married to Victoria Birabi. He was the father of Third Republic senator and minister Bennett Birabi. His Grandson, Naakuu Birabi, was Accord party's candidate for the Khana/Gokana federal Constituency in the 2023 general elections.
