= Stancliffe Hall =

Building in Derbyshire, England

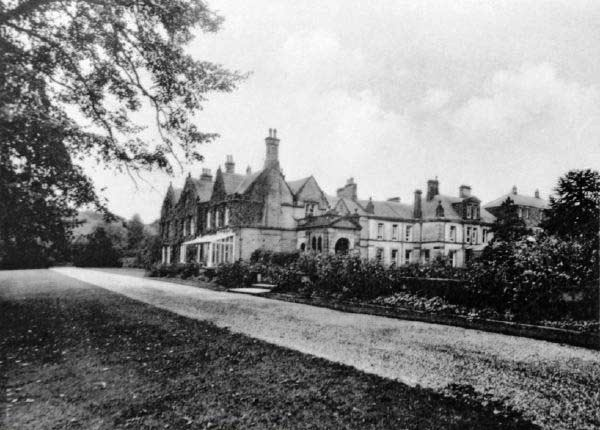
- Stancliffe Hall c. 1900

General information
- Architectural style: (Tudor in the 19th century)
- Location: Darley Dale, Derbyshire, England
- Coordinates: 53.1721°N 1.6012°W
- Construction started: 17th century, rebuilt 19th century

Website
- https://www.stancliffehall.co.uk/

Stancliffe Hall is a grade II Listed building on Whitworth Road in the settlement of Darley Dale, near Matlock, Derbyshire.

== Early history ==
In 1817, Magna Britannia reported that

Stancliff-hall, which appears to have belonged to a younger branch of the Columbell family, and to have been held under the manor of Old-hall, passed by successive female heirs to the families of Newsam and Pott. It afterwards belonged to Sir John Digby of Mansfield Woodhouse, who, in 1655, sold it to Robert Steere of Bridgetown, Gent. Sir Paul Jenkinson, of Walton, being possessed of this estate in 1715, gave it to his daughter Lettice, by whom the hall and estates were sold, in 1718, to Robert Greensmith, Esq., for the sum of £1750.

Herbert Greensmith Beard was living there in 1792 when he passed on manuscripts from the Columbell family which were made for Roger Columbell of Darley Hall who died in 1605 (which confirm the Magna Britannia version). That document records that Herbert Greensmith sold the hall in 1799 to William Heathcote for ten and a half thousand pounds. Heathcote was then in Batavia in the colony of Demarara. Heathcote's brother, John Heathcote and his family were living there in 1817. John died unmarried on 13 January 1821 aged 72 and left the Hall to his nephew Arthur Heathcote Shepley. Arthur changed his name to Arthur Heathcote Heathcote and was the principal owner of land in Darley holding 550 acres (2.2 km^{2}).

== Whitworth ==
Stancliffe Hall was bought in 1854 and again built, of stone, by the engineer Joseph Whitworth in the Tudor style. He and his wife moved into the Hall in 1870 when Whitworth had largely retired and was using his energies to direct the quarrying of stone from Whitworths quarry. The gardens were designed by Edward Milner; the architect for the 1872 renovation was T. Roger Smith, followed in 1879 by Edward Middleton Barry. A noted feature was the rockery, which Sir Joseph Whitworth had constructed out of a sandstone quarry.

It is reputed that Joseph Whitworth's wife died in an accident in a lift in the house.

In 1891, the hall was the property of Lady Whitworth, but it was occupied by Alfred Clay.

== Stancliffe Hall School ==
Early in the 20th century, the site became a private school with many scholars pre-1911 originating from Llandaff in Wales. The school was founded by the Rev. Ernest Owen who had been the headmaster of Llandaff School. Owen was renowned as an outstanding headmaster who believed in honour and that no boy ever left his schools.

In 1930 the school was bought by David Hugh Kirkman Welsh.

=== Noted students and staff ===
- Hugh Trevor-Roper suffered four terms here
- Pete Atkin taught here briefly in 1964
- Ken Wiwa, journalist, went here aged 10.

== In literature and film ==
The hall was mentioned briefly in An Elegy written in 1672 by Leonard Wheatcroft. More recently after Stancliffe Hall School closed in 2001 the site was used to film Stig of the Dump which was released in 2002.
