= Looking for Transwonderland =

2012 travel book by Noo Saro-Wiwa

- Author: Noo Saro-Wiwa
- Cover artist: Rod Hunt
- Genre: Travel writing
- Set in: Nigeria
- Publication date: 2012
- Publication place: United Kingdom
- ISBN: 978-1847083319

Looking for Transwonderland: Travels in Nigeria is a 2012 non-fiction memoir and travelogue by Noo Saro-Wiwa. In it Saro-Wiwa travels across Nigeria, re-discovering the country of her birth. The book has been compared to those of many other diasporic writers.

== Plot ==
The journey is made in the shadow of the death of her father Ken Saro-Wiwa, an environmental activist who was executed by the Nigerian government in 1995. One of the places that Saro-Wiwa visits is the books eponymous Trans Wonderland - an amusement park created as a Nigerian counter to Disney World. Beyond the poignant frivolity of the amusement park, Saro-Wiwa visits Nigeria's major cities - Lagos, Ibadan, Kano, Maiduguri, Port Harcourt. She also describes trips to the UNESCO World Heritage Site of Sukur, as well as visiting the National Museum, the restored shrine in Osogbo, and the Slave Relic Museum in Badagry. The book also focuses on everyday details, such as riding okadas. It is also critical of the oil industry.

== Reception ==
Parallels have been drawn between Looking for Transwonderland and Americanah by Chimamanda Ngozi Adichie and Travellers by Helon Habila, as well as The Atlantic Sound by Caryl Phillips, as well as All God’s Children Need Travelling Shoes by Maya Angelou, The Devil that Danced on the Water by Aminatta Forna and Red Dust Road by Jackie Kay.

Saro-Wiwa has also described how they are in a vanguard of European writers publishing travelogues on African countries; however other African writers have used the form, including Pẹlu Awofẹsọ. Her approach has also been characterised as a "diasporic travel-writer", whose views are formed by the liminality of their experience as a Nigerian who grew up in England. The book has also been characterised as a work of Afropolitanism.

== Recognition ==
In 2012, the work was featured as BBC Radio 4's Book of the Week. The same year it was featured by the Financial Times as one of their travel books of the year. In 2017, the book featured on New York Public Library's list "365 Books by Women Authors to Celebrate International Women's Day All Year".

== Translations ==
- Italian: In cerca di Transwonderland. Rome: 66thand2nd. 9 July 2015. ISBN 9788896538975.
