= Okada (motorcycle taxi) =

Commercial motorcycles common in West Africa

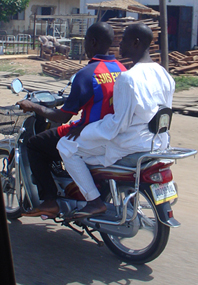
Achaba in Kano, Nigeria

An okada (also achaba, going, inaga) is a motorcycle taxi commonly used in Nigeria and other African countries.

Motorcycle taxis or okadas are also commonly used in some other West African countries, including Togo (oléyia), Benin (zémidjans), Burkina Faso, Liberia (phen-phen), Ghana and Sierra Leone.

== Etymology ==
Commercial motorcycles were nicknamed after Okada Air (a Nigerian airline that closed in 1997, itself named after the hometown of its owner, Chief Gabriel Igbinedion) because they could manoeuvre through the heavy traffic of Lagos and take passengers quickly to their destinations, in the same way as the airline. The ironic humour of an airline's name being used for commercial motorcyclists, as well as the local familiarity with Okada Air, caused the nickname of okada to outlive the airline from which it originated, which many Nigerians no longer remember. In January 2020, the word "okada" was added to the Oxford English Dictionary January updates, along with 28 other widely used Nigerian words.

== History ==
The use of motorcycle taxis in Nigeria predates the Babangida administration: they were known in the Cross River State in the 1970s while Achaba or motorcycle taxis were also present in parts of Yola and Gongola State (now Adamawa State) in the late 1970s and spread to Lagos through a group of individuals in the Agege Local Government Area. Okadas began to spread in the 1980s and became more popular in the late 1980s following an economic downturn in Nigeria, which was partly a consequence of the adoption of a liberal economic policy in the form of a structural adjustment program combined with rapid urbanization, unemployment, and inadequate intra-city public transportation. Some of the advantages of the use of motorcycle taxis for intra-city commercial transport are that they are readily available, and can easily navigate through narrow roads, rough terrain, and remote areas and meander through the hectic urban traffic, thereby meeting the unmet transport needs of some urban residents. Unemployed youths began to use motorcycles to earn money by transporting passengers swiftly to their doorsteps and sometimes on narrow or poorly maintained roads. This type of transportation quickly became popular, and acceptance of it increased steadily. Okadas are now one of the primary modes of transportation in Nigeria, and constitute a cheap and adaptable transportation system, the most popular informal one in the country. Even in remote villages, they arrive at regular intervals. It has become a means of transportation regularly used by people of all ages, men and women alike. Unfortunately, the rise in okada usage has been accompanied by increased occurrences of risky driving and accidents on Nigerian roads. As a result, okadas have come under heavy criticism, resulting in legislation intended to restrict or prohibit their operation in some Nigerian cities, notably Lagos in 2012.

== Nigerian society ==
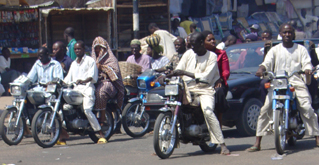
Okadas in Kano, Nigeria

Taxicab and bus service in Nigeria is inadequate, and congestion and poorly maintained roads are widespread. Okadas are used in cities such as Lagos by businessmen, government workers, and students to overcome traffic congestion, and can navigate roads that are inaccessible to automobiles and buses, particularly in villages and urban slums. Contributing to the flourishing of okadas is their low purchase price for operators, and their superior fuel efficiency, which is particularly important during petrol shortages in Nigeria.

Concerted efforts have been made in certain cities in Nigeria such as Abuja where an outright ban is in place to partial in Lagos.

Okada fares are usually higher than those of public transit. Riding on an okada has been described as "a unique experience" by both tourists and local users.

== Demographics of drivers and passengers ==
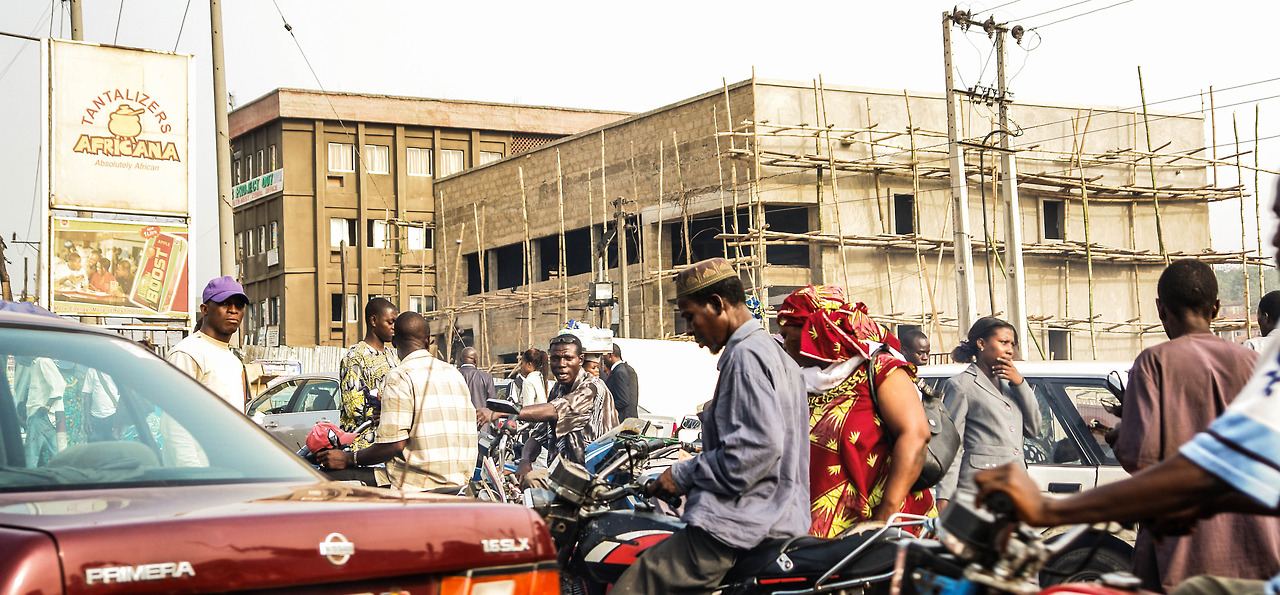
Okadas in Lagos, Nigeria

A study carried out in 1993 in Yola, a medium-sized city that is also the capital of the northeastern state of Adamawa, Nigeria, provides additional insight into the okada business. The study showed that about 88% of the okada drivers were between 18 and 30 years old, and only 47% had received any type of formal education. The survey also elicited information from 106 passengers. Customers generally were male (65%); were young adults between 18 and 30 years of age (57%); had completed at least secondary school (83%); were unemployed but in the job market (59%); and had low to moderate incomes (45%). They valued okadas mainly because they were fast and readily available. Reasons that customers disliked them were that they considered them to be unsafe (this was stated by 67% of the respondents) and expensive (stated by 43% of the respondents). A survey of okada customers in Akure also revealed customer concerns over safety—61% felt operators drove too fast and 31% said that they drove too recklessly. Left with few transportation options, however, many continue to patronize okadas despite knowing well the significant risks involved.

== In literature ==
In her travel book, Looking for Transwonderland, writer Noo Saro-Wiwa uses the transport frequently and delights in chaotic organisation.

== See also ==
- Boda-boda
- Motorcycle taxi
- Okogbe tank truck explosion
