= Pelu Awofeso =

Nigerian journalist

- Occupations: Journalist, travel-writer, tour guide
- Known for: Tour guiding, travel writing
- Awards: CNN/Multichoice African Journalists Award

Pelu Awofeso is a Nigerian journalist, travel and culture writer, based in Lagos, Nigeria. He is a winner of the CNN/Multichoice African Journalists Awards in the Tourism Category. He is often described as "Nigerian foremost travel writer." He is also a published author.

== Career ==
Awofeso claims to have become interested in travelling after a first encounter with the city of Jos in Plateau State of Nigeria in 1998. The encounter, which involved being awed by the beauty of the city as well as coming across "writing from the past by the British" who documented their travels during the times they lived in Nigeria as colonialists, inspired him to take up travel as a hobby.

Isaw images from 1930s, 1940s, 1950s; they were so strong I felt like I was seeing that time. After they left I don't think many people were doing that any more. Those encounters seeded me to want to follow in their footsteps, to travel extensively in Nigeria and document what I’ve seen. It made me develop more interest in Jos and also in travelling, to also write about this beautiful place people have written about 50 years ago. I wanted to write something that could actually benefit society. And I had to think about writing about Nigeria in such a way that people appreciate the country. Not just the foreign audience, but also Nigerians.

As of 2017, he has visited over 32 states out of Nigeria's 36 and written about a number of them. His work has been compared to Looking for Transwonderland by Noo-Saro-Wiwa.

In 2010, while he worked for 234Next, Awofeso won the CNN/MultiChoice African Journalist of the Year Award in the Tourism Category.

== Books and publishing ==
Awofeso is the publisher of an online travel magazine called Waka About. He is also the editor of Route 234, a book of travel stories described as "a collection of stories from Nigerian journalists detailing personal experiences while on journeys outside Nigeria" What it represents, "overall, is an intervention in a space where much more effort of this nature is needed."

In 2010, he published Tour of Duty, a book "which documents ten months travelling the width and breadth of Nigeria, and tells the stories of people and places he encounters on the way, from the sand sellers of Yenagoa to hunters in Osogbo."

== Other activities ==
Awofeso, in 2014, also founded a group called "Beach Samaritans" who walk around beaches in Lagos for the purpose of cleaning them of debris and unwanted trash.
