= Jim Wiwa =

Chief of the Ogoni (1904–2005)

- Born: 1904; Bane, Ogoniland, Rivers State, Nigeria
- Died: 1 April 2005 (aged 100–101)
- Occupation: Traditional ruler
- Title: Chief of Bane; Chairman, Council of Chiefs of Bane
- Children: Ken Saro-Wiwa; Owens Wiwa
- Relatives: Ken Wiwa (grandson)

Chief Jim Beeson Wiwa (1904 – 1 April 2005) was a chief of the Ogoni people of southern Nigeria, and the chairman of the Council of Chiefs of Bane. He was born in Bane, Rivers State. He was the father of executed playwright and environmentalist Ken Saro-Wiwa and of doctor and human-rights activist Owens Wiwa, and the grandfather of journalist Ken Wiwa.
