= Ken Wiwa =

Nigerian-Canadian journalist and author (1968–2016)

- Born: Kenule Bornale Tsaro-Wiwa; Lagos, Nigeria
- Died: 18 October 2016 (aged 47); London, UK
- Other name: Ken Saro-Wiwa Jr.
- Education: UCL School of Slavonic and East European Studies
- Occupation: Journalist
- Years active: 1999–2016
- Notable work: In the Shadow of a Saint (2000)
- Relatives: Ken Saro-Wiwa (father); Zina Saro-Wiwa (sister); Noo Saro-Wiwa (sister); Owens Wiwa (uncle); Jim Wiwa (grandfather)

Kenule "Ken" Bornale Tsaro-Wiwa (born Ken Saro-Wiwa Jr.; 28 November 1968 – 18 October 2016), although he himself chose to use the name Ken Wiwa, was a Nigerian journalist and author. The eldest son of human rights activist Ken Saro-Wiwa, he worked as an adviser to three Nigerian presidents.

== Background ==
Wiwa was born in Lagos, Nigeria, the eldest son of human rights activist and author Ken Saro-Wiwa. He was educated in Nigeria before going in 1978, along with his mother and siblings, to live in England where his father believed he would receive the best possible education at that time. Wiwa attended Stancliffe Hall School and Tonbridge School and went on to the School of Slavonic and East European Studies, now part of University College, London. He was editor of the United Kingdom's Guardian's periodical New Media Lab, where he developed content for the paper's online edition.

== Journalism ==
In 1999, Wiwa relocated to Canada, where he was a writer-in-residence at Massey College in the University of Toronto, Saul Rae Fellow at the Munk Centre for International Studies at the University of Toronto, a mentor at the Trudeau Foundation in Canada and a columnist for The Globe and Mail, where he was twice nominated for National Newspaper Awards for feature writing.

Wiwa addressed the European Union, Oxford Union and spoke at a number of colleges and universities, including Harvard University, McGill University and the University of Cambridge. He served as a conference rapporteur at a United Nations meeting on cultural diversity. A regular commentator on major news channels including CNN, BBC, Al-Jazeera, he appeared as a guest on the BBC television programmes HARDTalk and Newsnight.

In 2005, Wiwa was selected by the World Economic Forum as a Young Global Leader. He was the founding curator of the Abuja Hub for the Globalshapers Programme of the World Economic Forum and also served on the Africa Advisory Council of the Prince of Wales Rainforest Project. He wrote for The Guardian in the UK, and the Washington Post, The New York Times and National Geographic, in the United States. He served as an editor-at-large for Arise Magazine and contributed occasional columns for magazines, newspapers and blogs.

Wiwa produced and narrated television and radio documentaries for the BBC and CBC, and wrote commentaries for National Public Radio.

== In the Shadow of a Saint ==
His memoir of his father, In the Shadow of a Saint, was published in 2000 to overall positive review coverage. Sandra Jordan wrote: "Ken Wiwa does not spare himself in this story. He reveals self-truths he is not proud of. You feel for him. You feel for his father. His elegantly written book is a weave of Nigerian and family history, both turbulent, both tragic, neither without hope. The book is also a song of the Ogoni people, a tribute to their struggle, their endurance. It is, moreover, a story of being trapped in history; the children of heroes find their lives shaped by their parents, as Wiwa discovers when he meets Nkosinathi Biko, son of Steve Biko, Zindzi Mandela, and Aung San Suu Kyi."

The book was described by The Independent as "rich and readable", and by Africa Confidential as "an often sad but refreshingly honest book that provides a unique insight into the personal and political life of one of Nigeria's most dynamic and controversial figures", and for the Publishers Weekly reviewer: "Wiwa's impassioned and detailed memoir provides a superb overview of the Nigerian political landscape, as well as an excellent behind-the-scenes look at his father." In the Shadow of a Saint won the 2002 Hurston–Wright Nonfiction Award.

== Special assistant ==
In 2005, he returned to Nigeria, and the following year former Nigerian President Olusegun Obasanjo appointed Wiwa as his special assistant on peace, conflict resolution and reconciliation. He served President Umaru Yar'Adua as a special assistant on international affairs. Wiwa was also President Goodluck Jonathan's senior special assistant on civil society and international media, from 2012.

== Death ==
Wiwa died suddenly in London on 18 October 2016, aged 47, after suffering a stroke. Nigerian President Muhammadu Buhari paid tribute by saying: "Wiwa was an ardent believer in the unity, progress and stability of his community. I urge family, friends and associates to honour his memory by making his dream of an environmentally safe, secured and prosperous Ogoniland a reality."

== Selected writings ==
- In the Shadow of a Saint: A Son's Journey to Understand His Father's Legacy, Doubleday, ISBN 0385601859, 2000. Extracted in The Guardian as "A difficult martyr", 28 October 2000, and "A difficult martyr – part 2", 28 October 2000.
- "Letter to My Father", Index On Censorship, Vol. 34, No 4, 2005, pp. 24–29.
- "In the name of my father", The Observer, 6 November 2005.
- "We Nigerians are celebrating Mandela as the kind of hero we've never had", The Guardian, 8 December 2013.
- "Finally it seems as if Ken Saro-Wiwa, my father, may not have died in vain", The Guardian, 10 November 2015.
