= Owens Wiwa =

Nigerian activist

Monday Owens Wiwa (born 10 October 1957 in Bori, Nigeria) is a medical doctor and human rights activist. He is the brother of executed Ogoni leader Ken Saro-Wiwa, and the son of Ogoni chief Jim Wiwa. Wiwa is an internationally renowned expert on the effects of globalisation, especially as it relates to the highly controversial business practices of Royal Dutch Shell in the Niger Delta. Vice-chairman of the Toronto chapter of the Sierra Club Canada and an active member of Amnesty International, Wiwa is frequently called upon to advocate for development programs in Canada and abroad and to campaign for increased corporate responsibility. He was executive vice-president, West and Central Africa and Country Director, Nigeria for Clinton Health Access Initiative until December 2024. He is now a Global Health Consultant for Inadum Consult.

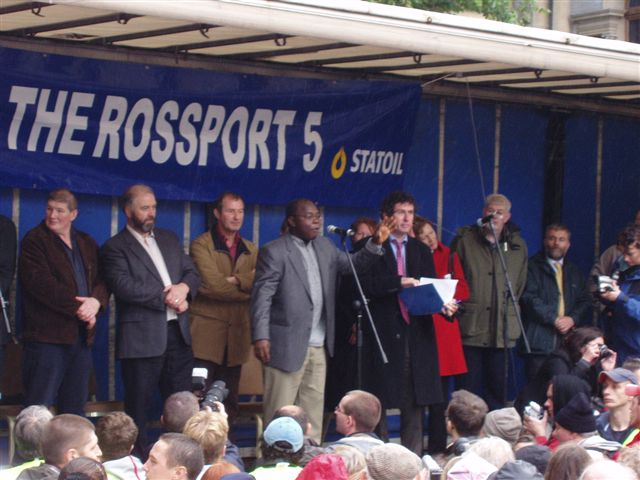
Owens Wiwa addresses a Shell to Sea rally in Dublin after the Rossport Five are released from prison

== Education ==
Wiwa graduated from medical school at the University of Calabar in 1985 and completed his internship at the University of Port Harcourt Teaching Hospital. In 1989, he founded his own private clinic in the Ogoni town of Bori.

== Activism ==
The six kingdoms of the Ogoni—Gokana, Ken-Khana, Nyo-Khana, Eleme, Babbe and Tai—are situated in the southeast corner of Nigeria's Rivers State in the heart of the Niger River delta. A tribe of fishermen and farmers, the Ogoni are an ethnic group, numbering over two million people. In 1958, Royal Dutch Shell discovered petroleum in Ogoniland. Over the next few years, Shell identified a total of six oil fields in the Ogoni territory which it began exploiting through a joint venture with the government. Over the next 35 years, this venture—in which the government was a majority partner and Shell the largest private partner—produced 634 million barrels of oil worth US$30 billion. Chevron, ExxonMobil, Texaco, BP, Agip and Elf Aquitaine also have operations in the delta and offshore, but their combined presence is dwarfed by Shell's.

In 1990, Ken Saro-Wiwa, a popular writer, television personality and businessman, founded the Movement for the Survival of the Ogoni People (MOSOP), a non-violent action group which called for Ogoni political self-determination and a greater share of petroleum revenue from the Nigerian government, as well as the ownership of the petroleum beneath their land. MOSOP claimed that pollution resulting from Shell's oil extraction turned their once abundant kingdoms into an ecological wasteland, their air reeking of sulphur, their water holes and creeks poisoned with petroleum, their night sky turned by burning gas flares into a perpetual twilight. For its part, Shell insisted that allegations of environmental devastation in Ogoniland were not true. "Any industrial enterprise, including oil operations, has an impact on the environment, and this is true in Ogoni," Shell said in an official statement. "A further impact on the lives of people in the area comes from the rapidly expanding population which has caused deforestation, erosion and over-farming leading to degraded soil."

At his clinic in the heart of Ogoniland, Owens witnessed an increase in cases of asthma, bronchitis and skin disease caused by the deteriorating environment. To address the social and environmental issues affecting his patients, Owens joined his brother's movement in 1992, becoming the chair of MOSOP's Social Welfare and Health Committee.

As MOSOP's spokesman, Ken brought the plight of the Ogoni people to the world stage. Throughout 1991 and 1992, he spoke at environmental conferences and high-profile world events, most notably addressing the United Nations Working Group on Indigenous Peoples in Geneva. In December 1992, MOSOP issued an ultimatum to Shell, Chevron and the Nigerian National Petroleum Corporation, calling for $6 billion in rent and royalties and $4 billion in compensation for environmental devastation—and all within 30 days or it would be assumed that they intended to quit Ogoniland. There was no reply. A month later, a Shell worker was rumoured to have been assaulted and Shell announced it was pulling out of Ogoniland to avoid placing its workers at risk. In February 1993, Shell held a meeting in London to discuss what it should do about the situation in Ogoniland in general and Ken Saro-Wiwa in particular. The government of Nigeria was also working on the "Saro-Wiwa problem".

On 28 April 1993, a US contracting firm accompanied by Nigerian military personnel was laying pipelines for Shell in Ogoniland. When a number of farmers complained about the bulldozing of their crops, ten thousand Ogonis held four days of peaceful demonstrations to protest the construction. The government responded by bringing in soldiers to suppress the crowds and, on the last day, one of the protesters was shot dead. Amnesty International issued an alarm over this incident.

Tensions in the delta increased in June 1993 after Saro-Wiwa was arrested and charged with sedition. After extensive pressure by Amnesty International and other groups, he was released a month later on bail. During this period, the government dispatched soldiers to seal off Ogoniland from the outside world, but on 30 July, the police were mysteriously removed from the area.

Five days later, the coastal Ogoni town of Kaa was attacked and destroyed. More than 100 people were killed and 8,000 were left homeless. The military described the incident as an "ethic clash" between the Ogoni and their neighbours, the Andoni. Both tribes denied any involvement or that they even had a dispute. In the autumn of 1993, ten more Ogoni villages were attacked with Kaa community now completely sacked. Seven hundred and fifty people were killed and thirty thousand were left homeless in these military-style assaults. Amnesty International believed the military supported these attacks and MOSOP accused Shell of complicity.

Because of his involvement with MOSOP, Owens was arrested and imprisoned in December 1993 and April 1994, as well as July of that same year.

In early 1994, Nigerian dictator Sani Abacha launched a full assault on Saro-Wiwa and the Ogoni. His military's agenda was set forth in a memo drafted by Major Paul Okuntimo stating: "Shell operations still impossible unless ruthless military operations are undertaken for smooth economic activities to commence." The document goes on to ominously recommend "wasting operations coupled with psychological tactics" during MOSOP gatherings.

On 24 May 1994, a massacre occurred at the palace of the Chief of the Gokana. Four Ogoni leaders sympathetic to the government and Shell were set upon by a mob chanting "vulture, vulture." They were beaten to death with clubs and burned. The military accused Ken Saro-Wiwa of inciting the attack even though he had been barred from entering Ogoniland earlier that day at a police roadblock. Nevertheless, Ken was arrested along with 15 others. They were held without charge, clamped in leg irons and tortured.

When Owens learned that Ken had been arrested, he travelled to Nigeria's largest city, Lagos, to confer with Ken's lawyer. When he arrived, he saw that the arrest of Ken Saro-Wiwa had made the front page of every Nigerian newspaper. The papers also listed the names of suspects the police were looking to apprehend for the same crime.

Owens Wiwa was number one on the wanted list. He went underground. Even though he was a fugitive, Wiwa met with human rights groups, environmental groups, church leaders, and western embassies in Nigeria frequently, informing them of the situation and requesting that they put pressure for Ken's release. The response to the campaign was overwhelming. The media reacted with a clamorous condemnation of the Nigerian military. Groups such as PEN International, Amnesty International, Greenpeace, the Sierra Club, and Human Rights Watch turned the arrest of Ken Saro-Wiwa into their cause célèbre. Royal Dutch Shell was vilified and boycotted around the world.

In February 1995, after being imprisoned for nine months without charge, Ken Saro-Wiwa was finally brought to trial. Bypassing normal legal procedures, Abacha set up a special military tribunal to try Ken and the others for the murder of the Ogoni chiefs. The international community condemned the trial as a sham.

On 31 October 1995, Ken and eight other Ogoni activists were sentenced to death. They were hanged less than two weeks later, on 10 November. International reaction to the executions was swift. The Commonwealth suspended Nigeria. More than a dozen countries, including the United States, recalled their ambassadors.

== Exile ==
Owens moved swiftly. With his ex-wife and infant son in tow, he escaped the country with his life. With the help of Anita Roddick and her socially conscious cosmetic empire, The Body Shop, the Wiwas found temporary safe haven in London. Among those who gave the refugee Wiwa family temporary shelter was British novelist Doris Lessing. After several precarious months in England, Owens was able to relocate his family to permanent safety in Canada with the aid of Greenpeace Canada and Toronto's Bloor Street United Church.

Wiwa resides in Toronto, Canada with his wife and three children.

== The search for the bones of Ken Saro-Wiwa ==
Canadian author J. Timothy Hunt's biography of Wiwa entitled The Politics of Bones documented Wiwa's personal battle against the Nigerian government to locate his brother's remains after they were buried in an unmarked mass-grave. Over the torturous course of ten years, Wiwa finally succeeded in locating and properly burying his brother in the summer of 2005.

== See also ==
- History of Nigeria
