= Zina Saro-Wiwa =

British video artist and filmmaker (born 1976)

- Born: 1976 (age 49–50); Port Harcourt, Nigeria
- Citizenship: Nigerian, British
- Education: University of Bristol
- Occupations: Filmmaker; video artist
- Years active: 2008–present
- Relatives: Noo Saro-Wiwa (twin sister); Ken Wiwa (brother); Ken Saro-Wiwa (father)
- Website: zinasarowiwa.com

Zina Saro-Wiwa (born 1976, Port Harcourt, Nigeria) is a Brooklyn-based video artist and filmmaker. She makes video installations, documentaries, music videos and experimental films.

Saro-Wiwa is the founding filmmaker of the alt-Nollywood movement – a movement that uses the narrative, stylistic and visual conventions of the Nollywood film industry but for subversive, politically challenging ends.

Formerly a BBC journalist, her artistic practice emerged from her interest in changing the way the world sees Africa, using film, art, and food. Her practice includes New West African Kitchen, a project where Saro-Wiwa re-imagines West African cuisine, each feast also featuring African video art presentations and a mini-lecture.

On 22 March 2011, Saro-Wiwa was named as one of the top 25 leaders of the African Renaissance in The Times newspaper.

In 2017, an article published on Norient highlighted that Saro-Wiwa's use of dubbing alt-Nollywood movies "subverts narrative, stylistic and visual conventions of the Nigerian cinema".

== Early life and education ==
Zina Saro-Wiwa was born in Port Harcourt, Nigeria, to Ken and Maria Saro-Wiwa. Her late father, the author and poet Ken Saro-Wiwa, became a well-known Nigerian environmental and human rights activist. He was executed in 1995 by the military regime in Nigeria when she was 19. She grew up in Surrey and Sussex in the UK, where Saro-Wiwa's wife Maria and five children lived. She attended the private girls' school, Roedean, in Sussex, and the University of Bristol, where she studied economic and social history.

Her twin sister is the travel writer Noo Saro-Wiwa, author of Looking For Transwonderland (published by Granta). Her older brother, Ken Wiwa, is the author of a memoir called In the Shadow of a Saint (published by Random House/Vintage).

== Television and radio career ==
Saro-Wiwa was a BBC reporter, researcher, presenter and producer. She worked freelance all over the network on BBC Radio 4, Radio 3, World Service Radio and BBC2. At the age of 20, she began contributing reports to BBC Radio 4's All in the Mind and In Living Colour programmes. She went on to work on a variety of BBC Radio 4 programmes including You & Yours, Woman's Hour, Home Truths, The Long View and also World Service arts programme, The Ticket.

She has presented four Radio series: A Samba For Saro-Wiwa, a two-part Radio 4 series in which she recounted her experiences in Bahia, Brazil; Water Works, a five-part series looking at water provision in the third world; Faith & Fashion, a two-part series on the intersection between high fashion and religion for the World Service, and Hello World, also for The World Service, where she explored Brazilian, Indian, Nigerian and British culture through the filter of their celebrity magazines.

From 2004 to 2008, Saro-Wiwa was one of the presenters for BBC Two's flagship arts magazine programme The Culture Show. In August 2008, she co-presented three BBC programmes (The Edinburgh Show) that covered the Edinburgh festival, alongside historian and BBC broadcaster Matthew Sweet.

In 2008, Saro-Wiwa interviewed Nigerian author Chinua Achebe at his home. On 5 June 2008, BBC Radio 4 aired the resulting half-hour programme about Achebe and his seminal novel Things Fall Apart on the 50th anniversary of the book's publication.

== Film ==
Saro-Wiwa began her career as a filmmaker with 2002's Bossa: The New Wave, a documentary short about contemporary Bossa Nova music, which she directed and produced. She went on to direct and produce Hello Nigeria! (2004), a 23-minute documentary that examines Nigerian society through the Nigerian celebrity and high-society magazine Ovation. Hello Nigeria! was screened at the New York African Film Festival in 2004. The film was covered by The Telegraph newspaper and was featured on the BBC's Talking Movies programme.

In 2008, after leaving the BBC's Culture Show, she began to focus on film-making and directed This Is My Africa (2008/9), which explores African culture through the anecdotes and commentary of London-based Africans and Africaphiles. Interviewees include artist Yinka Shonibare, actor Colin Firth, filmmaker John Akomfrah, Channel 4 News anchor Jon Snow, and actor Chiwetel Ejiofor. The film was screened at numerous galleries, museums and film festivals worldwide, including the New York African Film Festival, the Cambridge African Film Festival, Real Life Film Festival Accra, Stevenson Gallery and The Brooklyn Museum. It won the best documentary short at the International Black Docufest 2008. This Is My Africa was licensed by HBO, showing on the channel from February 2010 to February 2012.

In 2010, Saro-Wiwa went to Lagos, Nigeria, to make two films (Phyllis and The Deliverance of Comfort) in response to her fascination with the Nollywood film industry. The principles of the alt-Nollywood genre (low-budget films that purposely exploit Nollywood's visual conventions for subversive narrative value) were expressed in these two short films that were originally created for the exhibition Sharon Stone in Abuja:

Phyllis is an atmospheric portrait of a "psychic" vampire, a woman obsessed with synthetic Nollywood dramas, that lives alone in Lagos, Nigeria. The central Nollywood-inspired device in this short experimental film is the practice and significance of wig-wearing in Nollywood film, a practice Saro-Wiwa invested with deeper psychological as well as science-fiction layers. Underpinning this central idea, however, is a critique of the unforgiving treatment of single women in Nollywood and Nigeria.

The Deliverance of Comfort is a short satirical fable about a "child witch" called Comfort. The film is a critical and densely layered response to the belief in child witches in some parts of rural Nigeria and Africa. The film questions the very nature of belief and comments on the complex relationship between pre-Christian pagan belief and modern-day Nigerian Christianity. The relationship between Exu, the Devil, the human spirit and God. Inspired by the low-fi special effects employed in Nigerian Nollywood films, especially when the supernatural is being evoked, The Deliverance of Comfort uses these same techniques but challenges the conservative and unchanging ideas about the supernatural, drawing uncomfortable conclusions. The Deliverance of Comfort was shown at The Toronto International Film Festival in 2011.

In April 2012, The New York Times commissioned Saro-Wiwa to make a short documentary about the Natural Hair movement amongst black women for their acclaimed Op-Doc series. The resulting 5-minute film Transition was released in May 2012 and was the New York Times' most watched and shared video the week of its release.

The Film Society of Lincoln Center described Saro-Wiwa as one of the emerging African women directors who "challenge and question the taboo traditions of the Continent and the Black community at large".

== Video art ==
Saro-Wiwa's video art practise seeks to map emotional landscapes, exploring their resulting physical performances and cross cultural implications. The space and relationship between reality and performance of particular interest.

She began making video art in 2010 when she co-curated the exhibition Sharon Stone in Abuja, which showed at Location One Gallery on Greene Street in SoHo, New York. The exhibition explored the visual and narrative conventions of the Nollywood film industry. The exhibition featured artists: Pieter Hugo, Wangechi Mutu, Andrew Esiebo and Mickalene Thomas (with whom Saro-Wiwa created a Nollywood Living Room inside the gallery). For the show Saro-Wiwa also presented Mourning Class: Nollywood her first video installation and also her two alt-Nollywood films, Phyllis and The Deliverance of Comfort. The exhibition was covered by CNN and reviewed by Art in America magazine.

Mourning Class: Nollywood is the first in an ongoing video installation series in which Saro-Wiwa explores the practice and performance of mourning and grieving. For Mourning Class: Nollywood, she asked five Nigerian actresses to cry on cue for the camera, breaking their performance with a smile. The piece has been shown at Location One Gallery, at The New Museum as part of Transition Magazine's 50th anniversary birthday showcase and at The Pulitzer Foundation in St Louis. The work has been shown as both a single-channel and multi-channel piece.

In 2011, Saro-Wiwa went on to make Sarogua Mourning, a video installation that confronted her own inability to mourn her father's public death. For Sarogua Mourning, she shaved her head and attempted a mourning performance for her camera. The piece was first shown at Stevenson Gallery, Cape Town, and is currently on show at The Pulitzer Foundation in St Louis as part of The Progress of Love exhibition.

In 2012, Saro-Wiwa was commissioned by The Menil Collection to make a piece of work addressing the issue of love in Africa for the exhibition The Progress of Love. Saro-Wiwa created the project Eaten by the Heart, a video installation and documentary project exploring love performances and heartbreak among Africans and African Diasporans. The first stage of this project features three online documentary shorts and a 62-minute video installation featuring twelve pairs of African/African diasporic couples kissing for between four and seven minutes each. The installation is currently on display at the Menil Collection.

== Music video ==
In 2012, Saro-Wiwa shot and edited her first music video. "Dindi", a bossa nova and jazz classic written by Antonio Carlos Jobim, was performed by the São Paulo-based American jazz singer Alissa Sanders.

== Writing ==
In 2008, Saro-Wiwa was commissioned to write an essay about the Nollywood industry, titled "No Turning Back", for South African photographer Pieter Hugo's monograph Nollywood (published by Prestel).

Her short story "Lola of the Red Oil", based loosely on Saro-Wiwa's experiences as a lone teen traveller in Bahia, Brazil, was excerpted in a book for Riflemaker Gallery's 2008 Voodoo exhibition.

Saro-Wiwa's short story "His Eyes Were Shining Like a Child" was published by Sable LitMag in 2009.

== See also ==
- List of Nigerian film producers
- Ken Saro-Wiwa
- Ken Wiwa
- Noo Saro-Wiwa
