= Noo Saro-Wiwa =

British-Nigerian author

- Born: Port Harcourt, Rivers State, Nigeria
- Citizenship: British, Nigeria
- Education: Columbia University
- Occupation: Writer
- Years active: 2012–present
- Known for: Travel writing
- Notable work: Transwonderland: Travel in Nigeria
- Relatives: Zina Saro-Wiwa (twin sister); Ken Wiwa (brother); Ken Saro-Wiwa (father)
- Website: noosarowiwa.com

Noo Saro-Wiwa is a British-Nigerian author, noted for her travel writing. She is the daughter of Nigerian activist Ken Saro-Wiwa.

== Education ==
Noo Saro-Wiwa was born in Port Harcourt, Nigeria, and grew up in Ewell, Surrey in England. She attended Roedean School, King's College London and Columbia University, New York, and currently lives in London.

== Writing ==
Saro-Wiwa's first book was Looking for Transwonderland: Travels in Nigeria (Granta Books, 2012). It was nominated for the Dolman Best Travel Book Award, and was named the Sunday Times Travel Book of the Year in 2012. It was selected as BBC Radio 4's Book of the Week in 2012, and was nominated by the Financial Times as one of the best travel books of 2012. The Guardian newspaper also included it among its 10 Best Contemporary Books on Africa in 2012. It has been translated into French and Italian. In 2016, it won the Albatros Travel Literature Prize in Italy.

In 2016, she contributed to the anthology An Unreliable Guide to London (Influx Press), as well as A Country of Refuge (Unbound), an anthology of writing on asylum seekers. Another of her stories also featured in La Felicità Degli Uomini Semplici (66th and 2nd), an Italian-language anthology based around football.

Her second book, Black Ghosts: A Journey Into the Lives of Africans in China, was published by Canongate Books in 2023 and named the Edward Stanford Travel Book of the Year, 2025.

She has contributed book reviews, travel, analysis and opinion articles for The Guardian, The Independent, The Financial Times, The Times Literary Supplement, City AM, La Repubblica, Prospect and The New York Times.

Condé Nast Traveller magazine named Saro-Wiwa as one of the "30 Most Influential Female Travellers" in 2018.

She is a contributor to the 2019 anthology New Daughters of Africa, edited by Margaret Busby.

She narrated the BBC documentary Silence Would Be Treason, broadcast 15 January 2022. The documentary includes letters sent by Ken Saro-Wiwa to the Irish nun, Sister Majella McCarron.

In 2026, Noo authored The Burning Ground (Columbia Global Reports), which examines the social, political and environmental effects of the armed militancy that that arose following the death of her father, the environmental and human rights activist Ken Saro-Wiwa. She also wrote a report for The Dialtitled "Blood and Oil"on the impacts of international oil extraction in Nigeria.

== Personal life ==
Noo Saro-Wiwa is the daughter of the Nigerian poet and environmental activist Ken Saro-Wiwa, and her twin sister is video artist and filmmaker Zina Saro-Wiwa.

== Bibliography ==
- Looking for Transwonderland: Travels in Nigeria (Granta Books, 2012).
- Black Ghosts: A Journey Into the Lives of Africans in China (Canongate Books, 2023)

=== Selected articles ===
- "The unexpected consequence of gorilla conservation in Uganda", City A.M., 11 December 2019.
- "Her lipstick, her hair and her coat | Phoebe Waller-Bridge on the creation of Fleabag and the future", Times Literary Supplement (TLS), 16 August 2019.
- "Swimming With Sharks: Hillary and Chelsea Clinton discuss their new book, Gutsy Women", TLS, 22 November 2019.
- "Working-class heroine: Noo Saro-Wiwa shares insights and advice from Michelle Obama", TLS, 6 December 2018.
- "A land of conquest, casinos and copious wine, Georgia", City A.M., 5 July 2018.
- "What's in a name? Well, the right letters would help", The Guardian, 12 February 2015.
- "Boko Haram: Why selfies won't 'bring back our girls'", Prospect, 20 May 2014.
- "Bombastic, monochrome and simplistic – and yet still I love Top Gun", The Guardian, 16 May 2016.
- "Blood and Oil: What extraction did to Nigeria", The Dial, 24 March 2026.

== See also ==
- Ken Saro-Wiwa
- Ken Wiwa
- Zina Saro-Wiwa
