= San Antonio Shopping Center =

San Antonio Center
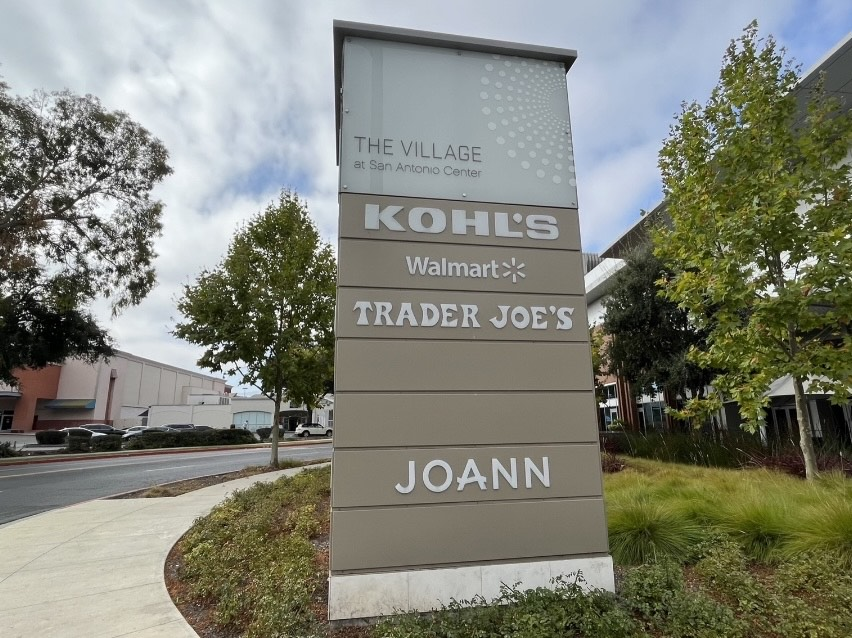
- Sign of San Antonio Center at California & Pacchetti in October 2022
- Location: Mountain View, California, United States
- Coordinates: 37°24′10″N 122°6′31″W
- Address: 2550 W. El Camino Real
- Opened: 1950; 76 years ago
- Developer: Ernest W. Hahn
- Manager: Merlone Geier Partners
- Owner: Federal Realty (original center); Merlone Geier Partners (The Village); Los Altos School District (Kohl’s parcel)
- Num. of stores: 55
- Num. of anchor tenants: 3
- Floor area: 250,000 sq ft (23,000 m^{2})
- Floors: 1-8
- Parking: 7,692
- Website: sanantoniocenter.com

San Antonio Shopping Center is an outdoor shopping center located on El Camino Real and San Antonio Road in Mountain View, California, United States, in the San Francisco Bay Area. The shopping center consists of two areas, owned by two separate companies.

- The namesake San Antonio Shopping Center is a traditional outdoor power center anchored by Trader Joe's, Walmart, and 24 Hour Fitness. It is owned by Federal Realty. In late December 2019, the land occupied by Kohl's, 24 Hour Fitness (which has consolidated into another pre-existing, expanded location within the shopping center), JOANN Fabrics, and several other businesses was sold to the Los Altos School District for $155 million for the businesses to eventually be demolished for a neighborhood school for students in the area.
- The Village at San Antonio Center is a newer mixed-use property with apartments, restaurants, a Hyatt Centric hotel, a Showplace ICON movie theater, and a Safeway supermarket. It is owned by Merlone Geier Partners. It also houses a park along with a fenced off dog park.

== History ==
Starting in the 1950s, the center was an open-air shopping mall, originally featuring Rhodes and Sears, with a Mervyn's opening later. Over time, the mall was expanded, with the Rhodes converting to Liberty House and J.C. Penney and a Best catalog showroom added. In the 1970s and 1980s, Atari Games (located nearby) used the Time Zone arcade at the shopping mall to play test all their arcade games. Most of the mall was demolished and partially reconfigured circa 1995 to make way for Walmart and additional retail shops.

Sears closed its doors in 2010, three years after it had originally announced its departure. Sears and the surrounding strip of retailers were replaced by phase one of The Village, consisting of a Safeway supermarket, apartments, retail, and restaurants. A second phase, anchored by a Showplace ICON cinema, broke ground in 2015.

In 2019, 9.65 acres (3.91 ha) of the shopping center was sold to the Los Altos School district to build a new school intended to be closer to nearby students than Covington Elementary School. There were also plans to designate the land as a new site for the Bullis Charter School, which had 2 campuses with portable units serving as classrooms, housed at the district's two junior high schools, Egan Junior High School and Georgina P. Blach Intermediate School. The original plan was to have the school open by 2023, but the COVID-19 pandemic has since delayed those plans. In 2020, JOANN Fabrics, T-Mobile, GameStop, and Luu Noodle permanently closed in preparation for construction; however, the buildings housing the former businesses currently sit vacant. In 2022, the 24 Hour Fitness located at 550 Showers Drive was temporary closed for upgrades. It reopened in November of that year and the location at 2535 California Street permanently closed, consolidating operations to its Showers Drive location. Kohl's was shuttered on January 18, 2025, and demolition is set for later that year. In July of 2025, Alamo Drafthouse opened a new location on the 19th taking over the previous Showplace ICON cinema. The new school is set to open for the 2027–2028 school year.
