= Katie Redford =

American human rights lawyer

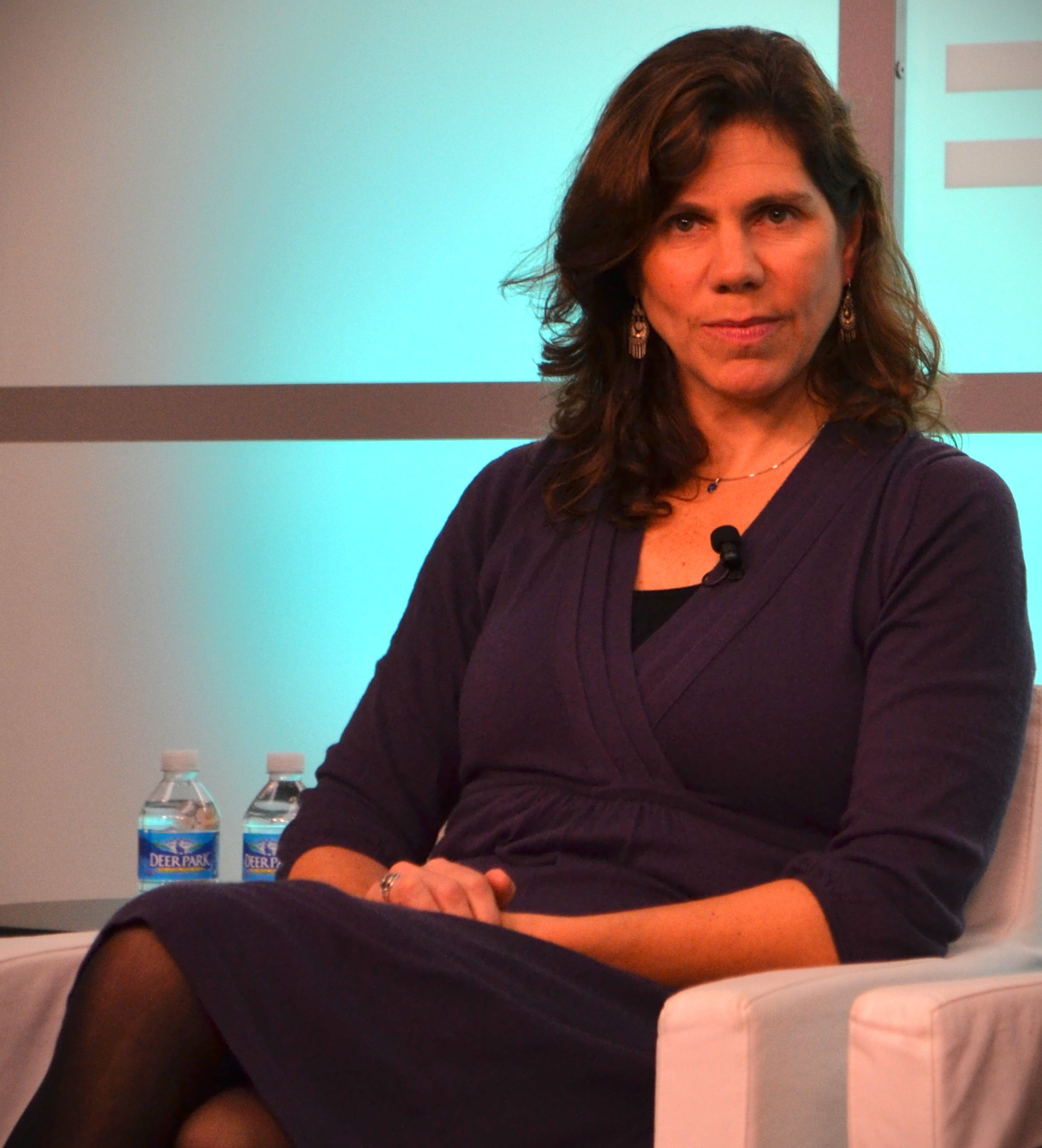
Redford in 2014

Katharine "Katie" Redford (born March 7, 1968) is an American human rights lawyer and activist who is credited with spearheading a movement to hold international companies accountable for overseas abuse in their home court jurisdictions, and in doing so, opened up new possibilities in human rights law. Along with her husband, human rights activist Ka Hsaw Wa from Burma/Myanmmar, she is the co-founder of EarthRights International, a non-profit group of activists, organizers, and lawyers with expertise in human rights, the environment, and corporate/government accountability. She left EarthRights in 2019 after 25 years to lead the newly founded Equation Campaign, a ten-year funding initiative working to bring about a safe future by enhancing the power of movements to keep oil and gas in the ground.

Redford is a graduate of the University of Virginia School of Law (UVA), where she received the Robert F. Kennedy Award for Human Rights and Public Service. She is a member of the Massachusetts State Bar and served as counsel to plaintiffs in EarthRights's landmark case Doe v. Unocal. Redford received an Echoing Green Fellowship in 1995 to establish EarthRights, and helped build the organization to a global institution with offices in Burma, Thailand, Peru and Washington, D.C. In addition to working on EarthRight's litigation and teaching at the EarthRights Schools, Redford has served as an adjunct professor of law at both UVA and the Washington College of Law at American University. She has published on various issues associated with human rights and corporate accountability, in addition to co-authoring ERI reports such as In Our Court, Shock and Law, and Total Denial Continues. In 2006, Redford was selected as an Ashoka Global Fellow.

== Human rights law ==
Redford introduced a simple and powerful idea into the human rights movement: that corporations can be brought to court for their role in overseas abuse. While American and European courts have customarily declined to hear cases where abuses have occurred outside their jurisdiction, Redford and her team at EarthRights International (ERI) broke their reluctance by uncovering legal tools and strategies that overcome the barrier of jurisdiction.

In 1994 Redford turned in a law school paper suggesting the use of an ancient federal statute to fight human rights abuses in Burma, The Alien Torts Claims Act. The act dates back to 1789, when George Washington signed the fledgling nation's first Judiciary Act. An obscure provision in it appears to give foreigners the right to sue in federal court over violations of international law. Though the act has been used to sue individuals, it has never been used successfully to sue a corporation for human rights abuses. Her professor gave her an A but warned that such a case would never occur. That student paper, "Using the Alien Torts Claims Act: Unocal v. Burma," became the basis of the groundbreaking case John Doe I, et al. v. Unocal Corp., et al. In March 1997 it became the first case in which jurisdiction was granted over a corporation for human rights abuses overseas. Unocal eventually settled the case out of court.

In 1995 Redford received seed money from Echoing Green to launch EarthRights International (ERI) with Tyler Giannini and Ka Hsaw Wa. EarthRights began its work with offices in Thailand and Washington, D.C., as a nonprofit organization that works at the intersection of human rights and the environment—which it defines as "earth rights"—by documenting abuses, mounting legal actions against the perpetrators of earth rights abuses, providing training for grassroots and community leaders, and launching advocacy campaigns.

EarthRights brought the case of John Doe I, et al. v. Unocal Corp., et al., to both state and federal courts in California. Most legal experts believed the case would never fly and at first it appeared they may be right. But seeing possibilities where the experts could not, Redford persevered throughout the protracted, ten-year-long legal battle. EarthRights had their case dismissed in 2000, fought back and won by appeal, the right to continue.

As the years passed, the case gained traction. Redford continued with legal work, fundraising and research, and building coalitions with likeminded organizations such as Center for Constitutional Rights. After several years of fighting an uphill battle without losing hope, the rewards finally came, in 2004. Unocal agreed to settle the lawsuit. It was the first time in history that a major multinational corporation had settled a case of this type for monetary damages.

In the landmark settlement, the company agreed to compensate the Burmese villagers who sued the firm for complicity in forced labor, rape, and murder. By combining human rights law and environmental law, EarthRights had come up with a new and untested strategy that succeeded where older solutions had failed. Their story was documented in the 2006 documentary film Total Denial.

Equally importantly, the Unocal case set a strong legal precedent. As a result of Earthrights' efforts, a series of rulings in the California Federal Court established that a corporation can indeed be held liable in U.S. courts for encouraging human rights violations by a foreign government. This put corporations on notice and forced them to consider their actions abroad. Unocal attempted to recover the damages from its insurer. The insurer did not pay, but instead reviewed its policies to ensure that it would not be liable to cover damages for murder, rape, and torture. Then banks began reviewing their liability for funding the projects. Thus, liability for abuse becomes an important business issue, not merely the preoccupation of a few activists.

EarthRights continues to use the Unocal case as a model to fight corporate misbehavior. Working in partnership with other legal organizations and private lawyers, they seeks to remedy abuses of earth rights—all over the world.

Today, at The Equation Campaign, Redford directs strategy, partnerships, and grantmaking focused on ending the expansion of fossil fuels in the United States, where the majority of global expansion is planned.

== Biography ==
Born on March 7, 1968, she was raised in Wellesley, MA and in 1986 she graduated from Wellesley High School. Redford attended Colgate University in rural upstate New York where she was a member of the swimming and diving teams. She found spending six hours a day in the water too much and later quit and began playing rugby, a Division I sport at Colgate.

After graduating from college in 1990, Redford signed on with the WorldTeach program and found herself teaching English in a village on the Thai-Burmese border.

On her summer break she visited a Thai refugee camp and lived with a family who had fled the Burmese military dictatorship. There she taught English in a bamboo hut. Along the border, bombs would explode from battles between the military and its opposition. Every day brought new streams of refugees, with tales of rape, torture, killing, and forced labor.

She headed home and in the fall of 1992, Redford enrolled at the University of Virginia Law School to study human rights and environmental law but as soon as school was out for the summer, she left again for Thailand. This time she went as an intern for Human Rights Watch, documenting abuses associated with forced labor. She returned to the same refugee camp to live with the same Burmese family she had stayed with the summer before. The father, a pro-democracy activist, arranged to sneak her into Burma. (The military, which staged a coup in 1988, officially changed the country's name to Myanmar the following year.)

That year Redford met Ka Hsaw Wa, a Karen student activist who had fled to the jungle and was collecting villagers' tales of abuse under the junta. She spent three weeks with him and a small group paddling up the Salween River, stopping at villages near the front lines of fighting between the military and the opposition and gathering villagers' stories.

The summer after their second year, she and two classmates got a fellowship to look at the World Bank's presence in Thailand and Burma. But Ka Hsaw Wa told them the real story was the Yadana Pipeline, being built by French company Total S.A. and Unocal, which is headquartered in El Segundo, CA. The 39-mile natural gas line cuts through the Burmese jungle to the Thai border.

Her third year, she did an independent research project on the Alien Torts Claims Act and Unocal's role in the Burmese pipeline. She also wrote a grant proposal to start EarthRights International, a nonprofit human rights organization. The day after she took the bar examination, in 1995, she returned to Thailand to live and run the newly formed group with Ka Hsaw Wa and a fellow law school graduate.

In November 1996, Redford and Ka Hsaw Wa were married in a Thai village. The following October, she filed Doe v. Unocal, and in March 1997 it became the first case in which jurisdiction was granted over a corporation for human rights abuses overseas. This case was documented in the 2006 film Total Denial.
