= Ka Hsaw Wa =

Burmese human rights activist

Ka Hsaw Wa (born 1970) is a Burmese human rights activist. He is a member of the Karen indigenous group. Along with his wife, environmental and human rights attorney Katie Redford, he is the co-founder and co-director of EarthRights International (ERI), an organization that focuses on human rights in Burma and other areas "where protection of human rights and the environment is intrinsically connected." Ka Hsaw Wa and Katie Redford have two young children.

== Biography ==
Ka Hsaw Wa was born under a different name, which he keeps secret in order to protect his family in Burma. He has not seen his parents in over 15 years. He adopted the name "Ka Hsaw Wa", which means "the White Elephant", while in exile in the United States. White Elephants are traditionally thought of by the Karen people as symbolizing righteousness and strength as well as a harbinger of great positive change.

Ka Hsaw Wa grew up in Burma as the son of a doctor and enjoyed relative economic privilege in his youth. However, when he entered college he soon became active in political causes, and quickly developed into a strong student leader. The Burmese government attacked the students brutally in 1988, killing many. Ka Hsaw Wa was captured and tortured. He then left Burma, but re-entered the country in order to participate in a lengthy photographic campaign documenting environmental and indigenous destruction, as well as severe human rights abuses, including starvation, systematic rape, and the destruction of entire villages. Most of the problems he documented were connected to the construction and operation of a petroleum pipeline in the area of Yadana for the oil companies Unocal (U.S.-based) and Total S.A. (based in France).

Ka Hsaw Wa, Katie Redford and EarthRights launched a federal lawsuit against Unocal, employing a unique legal strategy utilizing the U.S. Alien Tort Statute of 1789, which says that "federal courts have jurisdiction for torts that occur in violation of the Law of Nations, [which] includes abuses of fundamental human rights [and] genocide", in order to force the company to assume responsibility for human rights abuses caused by its actions. In this case, Unocal eventually agreed to pay compensation to the 15 anonymous villagers who suffered forced labor, rape, and the effects of killings. For about 30 years Ka Hsaw Wa has been recording people's stories to publish accounts of human rights violation in his homeland.

Ka Hsaw Wa continues his front-line activism, and was featured in the 2006 film, Total Denial. A description based on his role in the film is as follows:

"Ka Hsaw Wa dedicated his life to human rights activism, speaking fluent English and Burmese, dodging back and forth as he plays cat-and-mouse with the border guards, marrying another rights worker and even raising a family. All the while he is fighting to live and protect his homeland. At one point he describes how he was himself tortured. When he goes into difficult areas of the jungle, he takes a gun with a single bullet - to commit suicide if captured (to avoid torture)."

Ka Hsaw Wa and EarthRights are also involved in the current struggle for democracy and human rights in Burma, wherein a number of protesters, including monks, have been killed, and hundreds of protesters arrested. They are working to bring an end to the current violence against the people. In response to the 2007 protests, Ka Hsaw Wa has said:

"As someone who experienced this regime's brutality in 1988, I am glad that this time around, the world is watching. But that is not enough. The international community, including multinational corporations, must act now to prevent further bloodshed in Burma. The people have suffered profoundly for too long — they have already sacrificed so much, and they will not stop."

== Awards and recognition ==
- Goldman Environmental Prize (1999)
- Reebok Human Rights Award (1999)
- Whitley Award Winner (Human Rights & the Environment), sponsored by Sting and Trudie Styler (2004)
- Ramon Magsaysay Award for Emergent Leadership (2009)
