= Wei Yu 18 =

Chinese Squid Fishing Vessel

History

China
- Name: Wei Yu 18
- Operator: Weihai Huanhai Aquatic Co., Ltd.
- Home port: Weihai, China
- Identification: IMO number: 8782587; MMSI number: 412328785; Callsign: BBLZ2
- Status: Active

General characteristics
- Class & type: Fishing vessel, Hand liner vessel
- Tonnage: 917 gross
- Length: 195.76 ft (59.67 m)
- Beam: 32.15 ft (9.80 m)
- Depth: 20.34 ft (6.20 m)
- Installed power: 882 hp (658 kW)
- Speed: 12 knots (22 km/h; 14 mph)
- Capacity: 1523.60m³
- Crew: 42

Wei Yu 18 (Chinese: 威渔18), also referred to as the Shunze 76, is a Chinese fishing vessel which is a part of the distant-water fishing fleet operating primarily in international waters, targeting squid. It has been involved in several controversies related to labor abuses and poor working conditions.

== History and Operations ==
The Wei Yu 18 was built in September 2012 for Weihai Huanhai Aquatic Co., Ltd. (Chinese: 威海市环海水产有限公司), a company based in Weihai, Shandong Province, China.

The Wei Yu 18 primarily targets neon flying squid.

== Labor abuse allegations and deaths ==
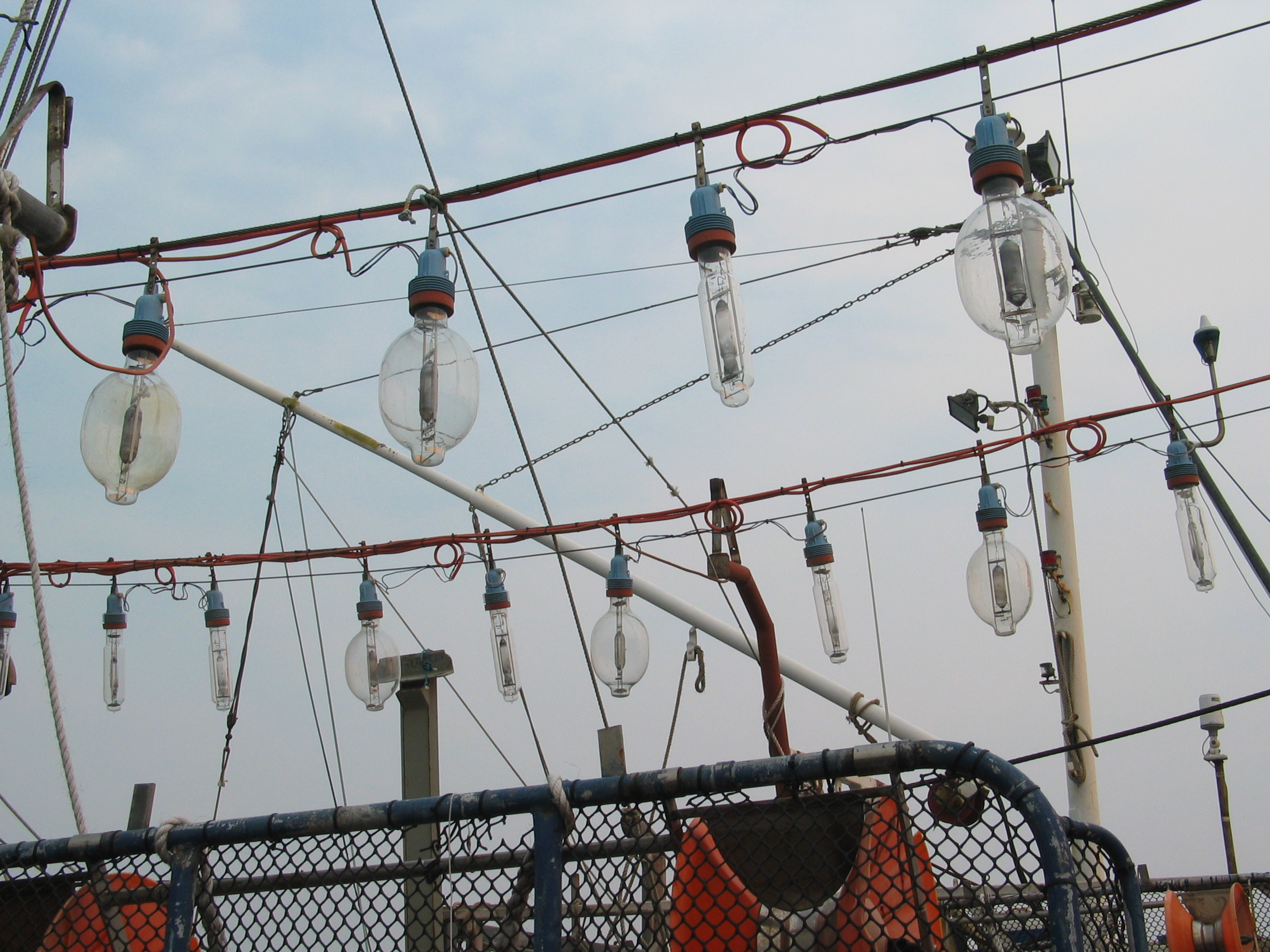
Powerful electric lamps in rigging of squid jigging (fishing) vessel used to attract squid at night.

The vessel, along with several other Chinese ships, have been implicated in numerous reports of labor abuses, particularly involving Indonesian crew members who have faced long working hours, inadequate nutrition, and violent treatment. These conditions have led to severe health issues, including instances of beriberi as a result of vitamin B1 deficiency, which has resulted in several deaths among the crew.

The living conditions on the Wei Yu 18 were reported as dire. Violence was a common occurrence, with the captain frequently beating the crew for minor mistakes or delays.

According to The Outlaw Ocean Project, the ship has experienced at least 2 deaths and 6 beriberi cases. The body of one crew member was buried at sea after initially having been held in the ship's freezer.

=== Death of Fadhil ===
Fadhil was a 24-year-old Indonesian working as a deckhand as part of a crew of 10 Indonesian and 20 Chinese workers. The crew worked shifts of between 12 and 24 hours, mostly at night, with little respite during the journey.

By August 2019, a year into their voyage, an outbreak of beriberi struck the crew. Fadhil fell severely ill, experiencing extreme fatigue, swelling, and difficulty breathing. Despite completing his one-year contract, he was denied permission to return home for medical treatment. Instead, he was given expired medication and left to deteriorate. Fadhil's condition worsened, leading to seizures and eventually his death in September 2019.

== Legal Issues ==
On November 16, 2023, a US-based non-profit named the International Corporate Accountability Roundtable petitioned U.S. Customs and Border Protection to halt the importation of squid linked to the Wei Yu 18 on the grounds that it was produced using forced or prison labor. This came after an investigation by The Outlaw Ocean Project.
