= Yetagun gas field =

Burmese gas field in the Andaman Sea

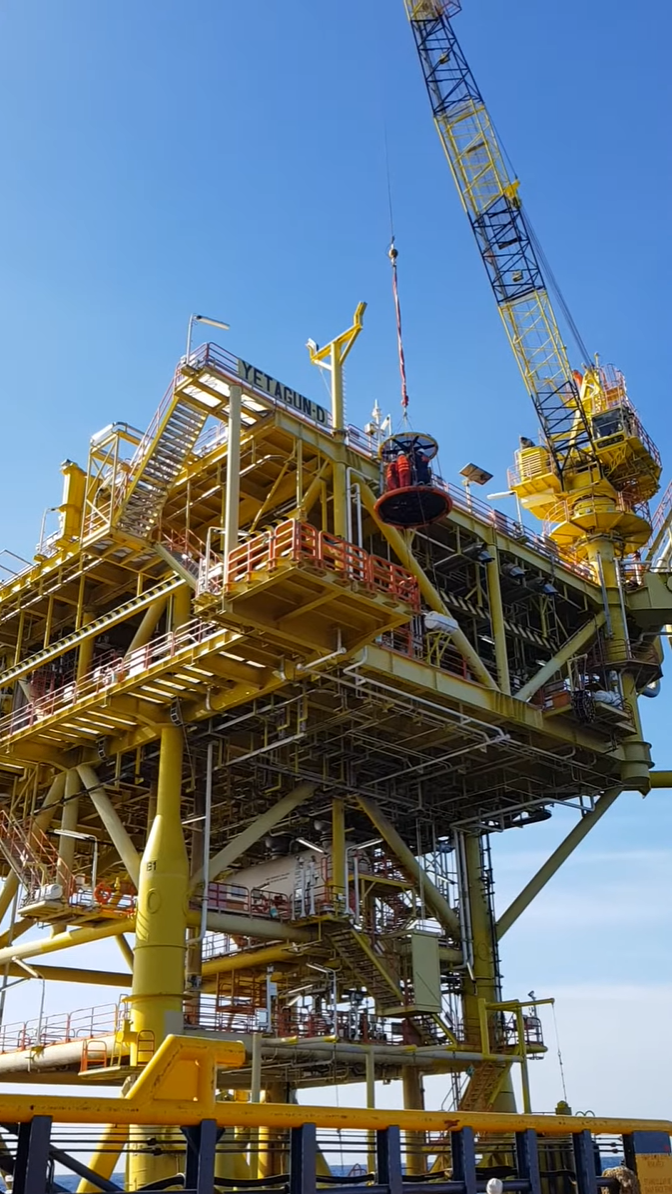
- Offshore platform

- Location within Myanmar
- Country: Myanmar
- Region: Andaman Sea
- Location: Taninthayi offshore area
- Block: M-12, M-13 and M-14
- Offshore/onshore: offshore
- Coordinates: 13.0725°N 96.873611°E
- Operator: Petronas
- Partners: Petronas (40.9%); PTT Exploration & Production (19.3%); Myanma Oil and Gas Enterprise (20.5%); Nippon Oil (19.3%)

Field history
- Discovery: 1992
- Start of development: 1996/1997
- Start of production: May 2000

Production
- Estimated gas in place: 3,200×10^{9} cu ft (91×10^{9} m^{3})

The Yetagun gas field is an offshore gas field in the Andaman Sea. Following the Yadana project, the US$700 million Yetagun ("Flag of victory") project was the second natural gas offshore project in Myanmar.

== Description ==
The Yetagun gas field contained a reserve estimated at 3.2 trillion cubic feet (91 billion cubic metres). In 2000, the production started at 200 million cubic feet per day (5.7 million cubic metres per day) and could go up to 300 million cubic feet per day (8.5 million cubic metres per day). It travels through a 169-mile (272 km), 24-inch (610 mm) diameter pipeline to Thailand. About 140 miles (230 km) of the pipelines is undersea, and the rest of it is onshore, where it links with the Yadana pipeline. Also, Yetagun could produce eight to nine thousand barrels of gas condensate per day.

== History ==
The Yetagun gas field was a joint venture between Texaco (50%), Premier Oil (30%), and Nippon Oil (20%). After Texaco withdrew in 1997 and Premier Oil withdrew in 2002, Petronas became the operator.

In 2008, the Yetagun gas pipeline had a problem with leaking, causing a loss of 400-500 million cubic feet per day (cfd) to Thailand.

In 2011, a helicopter hired by Petronas to work at Yetagun crashed in the Andaman Sea, killing 3 people while 11 people survived.

== Controversy ==
Some controversy exists regarding the Yetagun (and Yadana) pipeline since some of the profits go to the Burmese government which has a poor human rights record. Also, the main export pipeline runs through an area associated with the Mon and Karen ethnic minorities. There have also been reports of forced labor to build a railway to the pipeline terminus. Furthermore, some are concerned about the environmental impact the pipelines will have on forests.

Though Texaco sold its shares for ostensibly commercial reasons, some believe that the US government’s sanctions on investments in Burma contributed to their withdrawal. Similarly in 2002, when Premier withdrew, activists claimed victory in a 10-year-long campaign against the company’s activity, whereas Premier insisted it pulled out due to commercial interests.

== See also ==
- Yadana gas field
