= Corporate accountability (disambiguation) =

Corporate accountability is the acknowledgement and assumption of responsibility for the consequences of a company's actions.

Corporate accountability may also refer to:

- Corporate accountability for human rights violations
- Corporate Accountability, an American non-profit organization
- Social accounting
- Environmental accounting
- Corporate social responsibility
