= Sasja Beslik =

Swedish financial expert (born 1974)

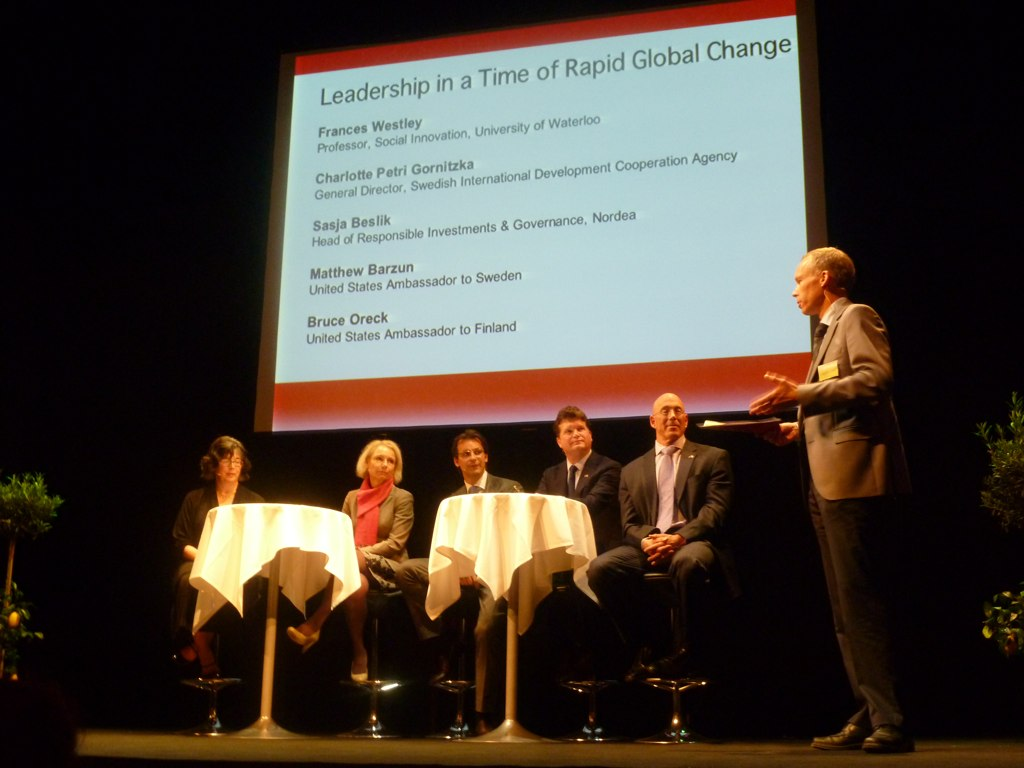
- Beslik (center)
- Born: December 24, 1974 (age 51); Zenica, Bosnia and Herzegovina
- Education: Stockholm University
- Occupation: Financial expert
- Years active: 1998-present
- Known for: Promoting financial sustainability
- Website: LinkedIn profile

Sasja Beslik (born December 24, 1974) is a Swedish and international financial expert known for promoting financial sustainability across the world. He has been employed by J. Safra Sarasin since 2019.

== Life and career ==
Beslik was born in Zenica, Bosnia and Herzegovina. The Bosnian War broke out in 1992, when he was 18 years old. Next year, he spent months sleeping in city parks and was almost executed during his escape from war-torn central Bosnia. He escaped to Poland and then to Sweden, where he spent seven months in a refugee camp learning Swedish and waiting for his residency papers. Once he became a Swedish citizen, he enrolled at Stockholm University, where he studied economics and journalism.

As a journalist, he covered wars and humanitarian crises for the Red Cross from 1998 to 2000. Then he worked as a social impact assessment expert for BP in Angola, Georgia, and Nigeria. In 2004, he landed his first bank job as Head of Responsible Investments and later as deputy CEO at Banco Funds/ABN AMRO branch in Stockholm.

His work for Nordea started in 2009, when he became head of responsible investments and corporate governance. He was named CEO of Nordea Investment Funds Sweden in 2011 and head of responsible investments and identity at Nordea Asset Management in 2013. Finally, at the beginning of 2017, Nordea placed Beslik at the head of a new unit, Sustainable Finance, tasked with implementing the decisions made by the company's corporate responsibility unit.

He is the author of the books "Where the Money Tree Grows" (2021) and "Guld och gröna skogar" (2019) and the weekly newsletter "ESG on a Sunday". In 2019, he left Nordea to join Bank J. Safra Sarasin. As of 2025, he was Chief Investment Strategy Officer for SDG Impact in Japan, a fund that invests in recycle, recapture and reuse technologies.

== Sustainability work ==
In the early 2010s, Beslik and his Nordea team started complementing the company's investments (worth €320 billion in 2018) with information about how their partner companies handled environmental protection, social responsibility, and business ethics. When a company was not compliant with their requirements, they tried to change its behaviour. If that did not work, they would pull out, even in case of multinationals such as Boeing and Lockheed Martin. Beslik's approach was at the heart of a general shift towards long-term and sustainable investments in Nordic countries.

When the Dakota Access Pipeline project became the target of protests in early 2016, Beslik visited the affected Sioux tribe and concluded that Native Americans had not been properly consulted. He quarantined three of Nordea's partner companies for the six months needed for a risk assessment and consultations with Greenpeace, which described it as a breakthrough. Beslik announced that Nordea would pull out if the companies breached the tribe's rights. When they refused to comply, Nordea's fund managers were instructed not to invest in them any more. This stance affected other investors: the ING Group sold its stake in the pipeline in March 2016.

Beslik showed that the Swedish fast fashion giant H&M could double the salary of its workers in Bangladesh, raising it to a living wage, by increasing its clothing prices by half a dollar.

He has researched the scarcity of cobalt as a key raw material for electric car batteries. Visiting the Democratic Republic of the Congo on several occasions, he examined how local cobalt producers handled the resulting long-term risks such as human rights violations.

When a massive breach of personal data of Facebook users was revealed in March 2018, Beslik announced that Nordea would "quarantine" Facebook investments, meaning it would no longer authorize the buying of Facebook stock in its sustainable investment unit.

== Awards ==
Beslik won the Swedish Banking Profile of the Year award in 2016.

In 2013, he received the H. M. The King's Medal, 8th size with the ribbon of the Order of the Seraphim from King Carl XVI Gustaf of Sweden for outstanding contributions within Swedish environmental and sustainability theory.

He was chosen as a Young Global Leader at the World Economic Forum meeting in Davos in 2011.

Stars Fund, the Nordea sustainable fund launched by Beslik in 2011, was chosen as Sweden's best overall equity fund in 2017. It was the first sustainable fund to receive the award.

In 2020, Beslik was ranked the world's most influential person within green finance.
