= Joe Hurd =

American technology executive, public company board member and public servant (born 1969)

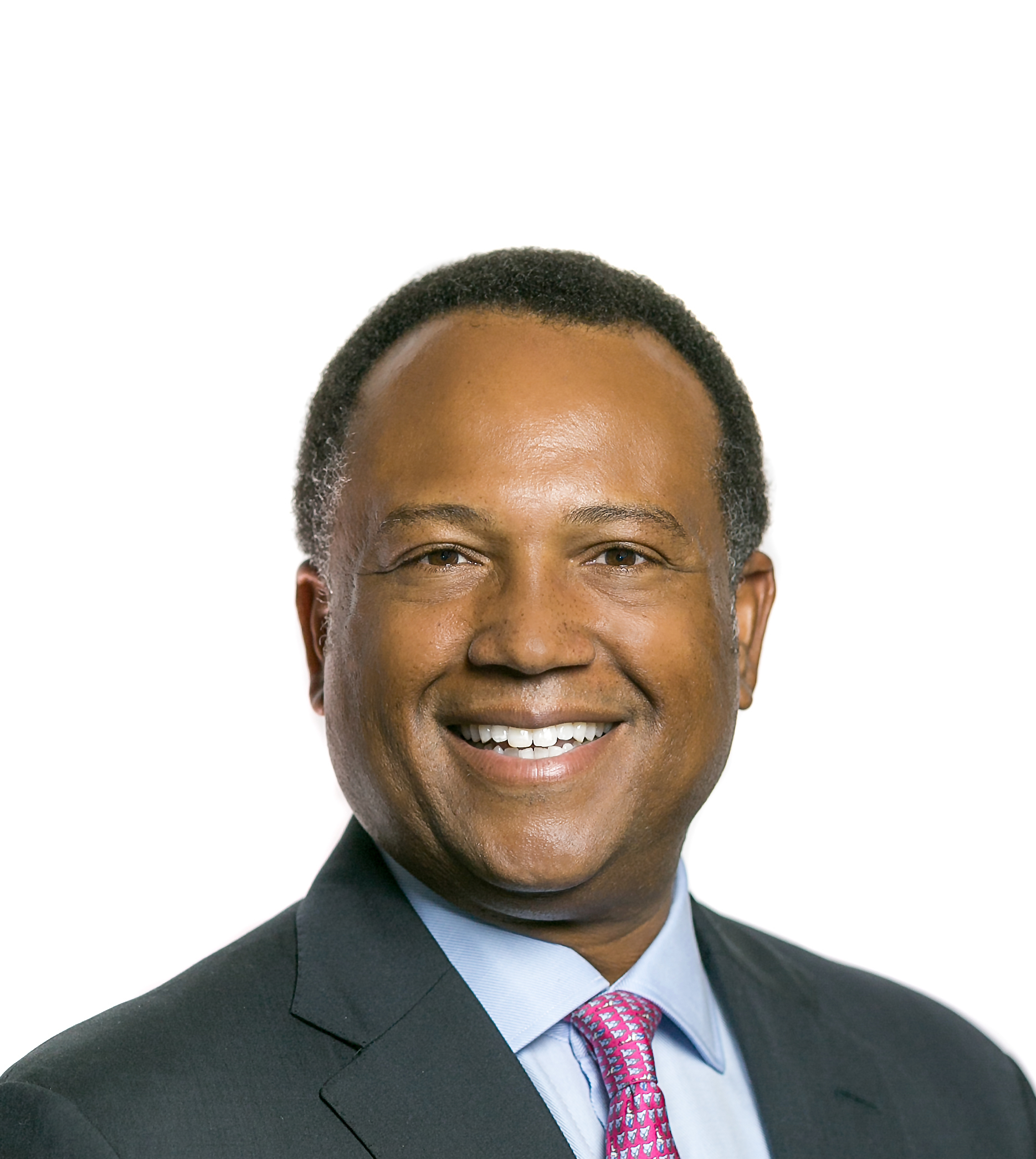
- Joe Hurd (2020)
- Born: Joseph Kindall Hurd III; August 25, 1969 (age 57); The Bronx, New York, U.S.
- Education: Harvard College (A.B. (1991)); Columbia University (M.I.A. (1994)); Harvard Law School (J.D. (1995))
- Occupations: Businessman; Board Member; Lawyer
- Years active: 1995-present
- Known for: Board of Directors; Political appointee
- Political party: Democratic
- Board member of: Lloyd's of London; Hays plc Trustpilot; SilverBox Capital; Computer History Museum; Harvard College Fund
- Spouse: Christina Mireles (2002-present)
- Children: 1 daughter 2 sons
- Website: www.joehurd.com

Joe Hurd (born August 25, 1969) is an American technology executive, public company board member and public servant. Currently, he is an Operating Partner at SOSV, a $1.5B early-stage venture fund, where he leads strategy and business development efforts for the fund's life sciences, deep tech hardware and mobile portfolio companies, and a Venture Partner for Good Growth Capital, a female-led venture capital fund. Hurd sits on the board of three companies based in the UK: Lloyd's of London, Hays plc and Trustpilot Group plc. He is also an Advisor to SilverBox Capital. Currently, Hurd is a Trustee of the Computer History Museum and on the executive committee of the Harvard College Fund. Hurd advises numerous innovative Silicon Valley–based pre-seed and seed stage start-ups on go-to-market strategy, revenue models, and international expansion through his advisory firm, The Katama Group, LLC, with a particular emphasis on diverse founders.

From 2009 to 2012, Hurd served as a political appointee in the United States Department of Commerce during the first term of President Barack Obama. Previously, Hurd was an executive at Facebook, Inc., and was part of the founding management teams at Friendster, Inc. and VideoEgg, Inc. (now SAY Media, Inc.). He is a member of the Council on Foreign Relations (Membership Committee), the National Association of Corporate Directors, the Private Directors Association and the Trilateral Commission. Previous non-profit director roles held are Menlo College (1 term as a Trustee, 2020–2024), the American Swiss Foundation (2011–2023), and Bullis Charter School (2013–2020). Hurd lives in Los Altos, California.

== Early life ==
=== Childhood ===
Hurd was born in 1969, in The Bronx, New York City to Jean (née Challenger) and Dr. Joseph K. Hurd Jr. He has a younger brother. His father was a gynecologist at Lahey Clinic in Burlington, Massachusetts and his mother worked as an elementary school teacher and principal in Newton, Massachusetts. Hurd was raised in Wellesley Hills, Massachusetts, and graduated from Wellesley High School in 1987, where he was elected student body president and captained his high school swimming and track teams.

=== College, graduate school and law school ===
In 1987, Hurd enrolled at Harvard College and studied Japanese history and politics. In 1991, he was one of two students in his Harvard class to receive an A.B. cum laude from both the East Asian Studies and Government departments. His senior thesis, on Japan's foreign policy towards South Africa during the apartheid era, was awarded departmental honors.

After college, Hurd was awarded a full-tuition merit scholarship from Mort Zuckerman to study at the School of International and Public Affairs at Columbia University, where he spent one year as a Zuckerman Fellow and International Affairs Fellow in 1991 to 1992. He pursued a combined field of study while at Harvard Law School, and received a Master of International Affairs degree from Columbia in 1994 and a J.D. from Harvard Law School in 1995.

== Personal life ==
On May 26, 2002, he married Christina Mireles, an attorney. They have one daughter and two sons.

== Career ==
=== Early career ===
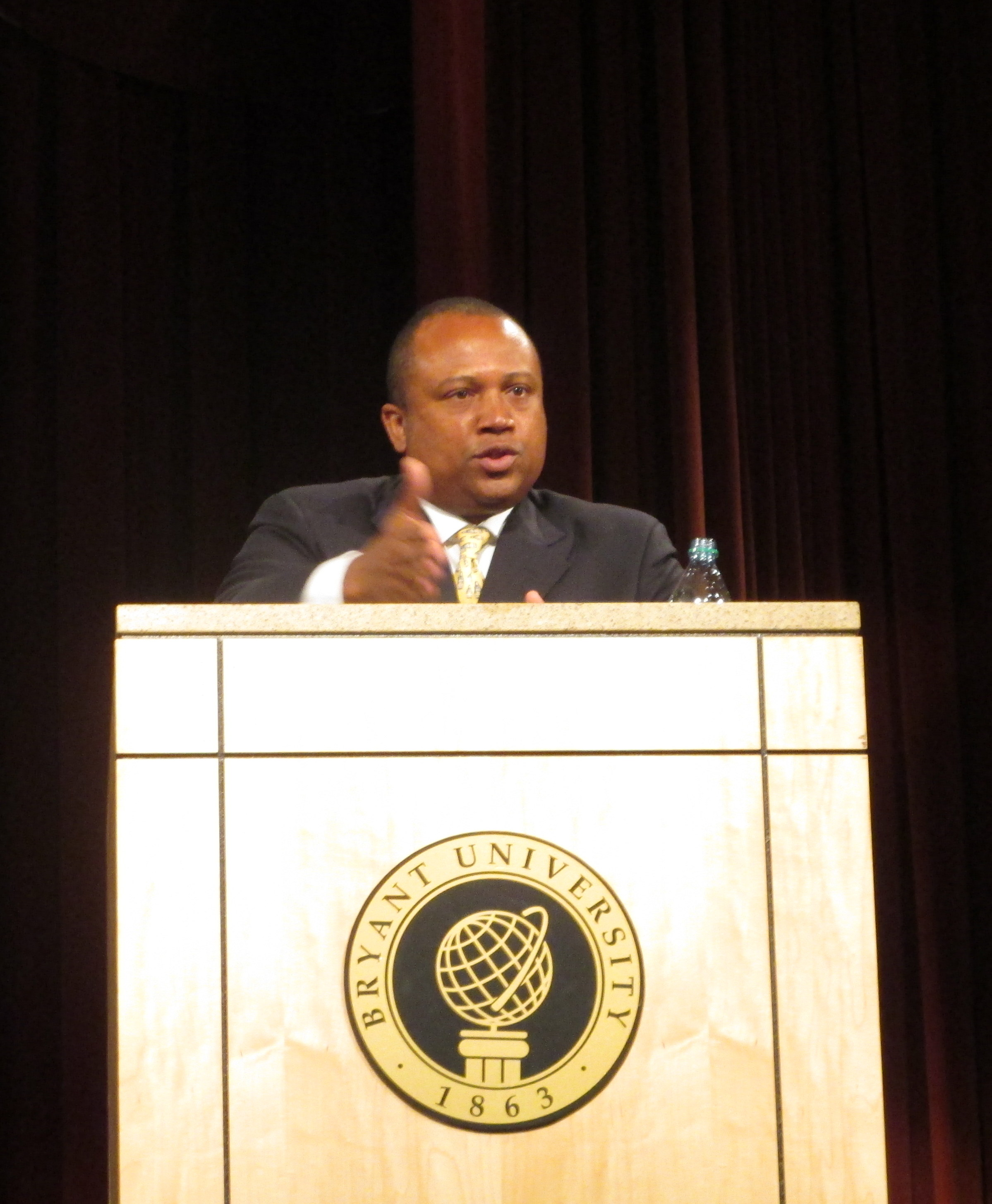
Joe Hurd speaking at Bryant University (N. Smithfield, RI), October 2012

After law school, Hurd served as a law clerk for Judge William G. Young of the U.S. District Court in Boston, Massachusetts. He was admitted to the bar in New York (1996), Massachusetts (1996) and the District of Columbia (1997). From 1996 to 2000, he practiced corporate and securities law in London for Linklaters, the British law firm. While at Linkaters, Hurd qualified as a solicitor of the Senior Courts of England and Wales (1999).

=== AOL ===
In 2000, Hurd joined AOL, Inc. as an executive director, AOL International to lead AOL's business development efforts in Japan and Australia. While at AOL's Japanese joint venture, DoCoMo AOL, Hurd negotiated the first deal for AOL to offer its broadband access service outside the United States, and the first deal to distribute AOL Instant Messenger on the popular i-Mode phone network in Japan. He later transferred to AOL|7 Pty, AOL's Australian joint venture, to run business development efforts in Australia and New Zealand.

=== Friendster ===
From early 2004 until early 2006, Hurd was part of the initial management team at Friendster, responsible for Friendster's international operations. While at Friendster, Hurd monetized a user base that grew from 3 million to over 20 million through launching products and services that appealed to a Southeast Asian audience, such as online games, classifieds and a mobile SMS service.

=== VideoEgg ===
After leaving Friendster, Hurd joined the founders of VideoEgg, Inc. (now SAY Media, Inc.) in 2006 as the company's first business hire. Hurd grew VideoEgg's business from zero to over $30 million in annual revenue, and built sales teams in England and Australia.

=== Obama Administration ===
External videos
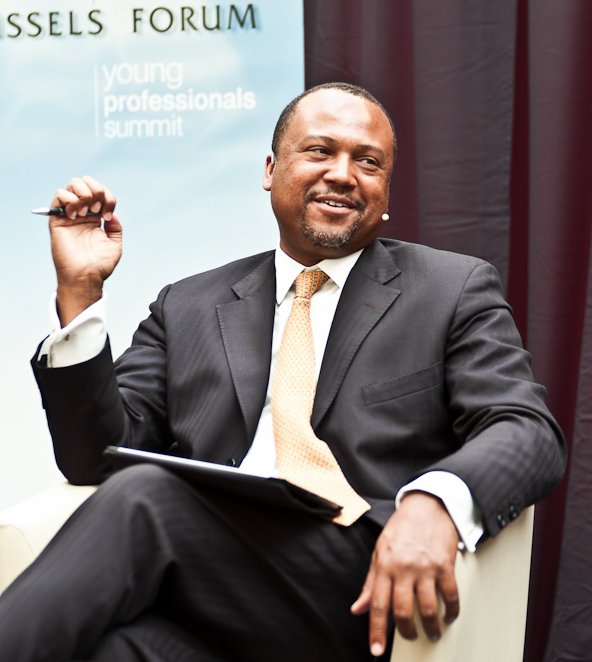
- Roundtable on the National Export Initiative ft. Joe Hurd, Department of Commerce,
- Administración Obama y la sostenibilidad-Joseph Hurd,

During 2008, Hurd worked on the Barack Obama presidential campaign, as part of the foreign policy research staff and helping to set up the voter protection effort in Washoe County, Nevada. In mid-2009, Hurd joined the Obama administration as a senior director, export promotion and trade policy, working at the Commerce Department. While at Commerce, Hurd was the political lead for the Trade Promotion Coordinating Committee, where he helped implement the National Export Initiative. He authored the first-ever NEI Report to the President as well as the 2011 National Export Strategy, both of which were delivered to the White House. Hurd also served as a member of the White House Business Council, talking to business leaders nationwide about the importance of export promotion.

=== Facebook ===
In 2015, Hurd joined Facebook in Menlo Park, California, to lead the emerging businesses team in the company's Global Marketing Solutions division. Hurd led a team focused on go-to-market operations and strategy for a number of Facebook's new business initiatives.

=== Public Company Board Service ===
Hurd has become well known for his extensive public company board service, primarily with companies listed on the London Stock Exchange. His first board was in 2018 with GoCo Group plc (LSE: GOCO), which was acquired by Future plc in February 2021. After GoCompare, Hurd joined the boards of Trustpilot in 2021, where he is the designated Non-Executive Director for Workforce Engagement and sits on the Audit, Remuneration and Nominating Committees; Hays plc in 2021, where he Chairs the ESG Committee and sits on the Audit, Remuneration Committees; and Lloyd's of London (privately held), where he sits on the Audit, Risk, ESG and Nominations Committees.

In the United States, Hurd served as the Lead Independent Director of SilverBox Engaged Merger Corp I, which listed on the Nasdaq in March 2021 and subsequently merged with Black Rifle Coffee Company in February 2022.

=== Advising startup founders ===
In 2003, Hurd founded a business consultancy, the Katama Group, LLC. He advises startup founders on market entry/business development/financing and strategy issues and invests in early-stage companies.

== Public service ==
=== Bullis Charter School ===
In January 2013, Hurd joined the board of directors of Bullis Charter School, the top-ranked charter school in the State of California. Hurd joined Bullis Charter to bring his expertise in public policy and public relations to the school. In 2014, Bullis Charter School entered into a five-year standstill agreement to end outstanding litigation with the Los Altos School District, and Hurd has been quoted in local papers calling for increased dialogue to resolve the lawsuits. Hurd stepped down as Board Chair and President of the Bullis Charter School Board in 2020.

=== American Swiss Foundation ===
In 2011, Hurd was elected to the board of directors of the American Swiss Foundation, a non-profit organization that fosters relations between the two countries. The group represents Switzerland's leading banks, insurance and multinational corporations. Since 2010, Hurd has served as co-chair of the Foundation's alumni council, representing over 1,000 alumni of the annual young leaders program.

=== Council on Foreign Relations ===
Hurd is the co-chair of the Diversity Committee and a member of the Committee on Membership of the Board of Directors of the Council on Foreign Relations (CFR). The Committee on Membership meets twice annually to recommend candidates to be elected to CFR membership.

=== Trilateral Commission ===
Hurd is one of 130 North American members of the Trilateral Commission

=== Global network ===
Since 1986, Hurd has participated in a number of global leadership development programs, hosted by the governments of Spain, Germany, Switzerland, Japan and England. A partial list of the programs he has participated in follows:

- American Field Service (Japan), 1986
- Japan–America Student Conference (Japan), 1988
- St. Gallen Symposium (Switzerland), 1992 and 1995
- British–American Project (England), 2004
- Atlantik-Brücke (Germany), 2006
- U.S.–Spain Council Young Leaders Program (Spain), 2008
- Transatlantic Network 2020 (EU), 2008
- American Swiss Young Leaders Conference (Switzerland), 2008
- U.S.–Japan Leadership Program (Japan), 2009 and 2010
- Brussels Forum, Young Professionals Summit (Belgium), 2011, 2012 and 2013
- Australian American Leadership Dialogue (Australia), 2012 and 2013
- The Atlantic Dialogues, German Marshall Fund (Morocco), 2013

=== Support for political candidates ===
Hurd is a member of the Democratic Party, and has worked on the issues, Get out the vote and voter protection staff for numerous presidential and senate campaigns, including Michael Dukakis in the 1988 United States presidential election, for Dianne Feinstein in the United States Senate special election in California, 1992, and for Barack Obama in the Barack Obama presidential campaign, 2008 and the Barack Obama presidential campaign, 2012. In September, 2012, Hurd represented the Obama Administration at a "Rock the Vote" event in Madrid, Spain, during the 2012 campaign.

== Media appearances and commentary ==
On April 2, 2006, Hurd and his wife, Christina Mireles, were interviewed by Lesley Stahl on the CBS show, 60 Minutes, in a segment titled “Working 24/7” devoted to the impact of technology on the work/life balance. The segment featured Hurd advising global clients and building his advisory practice while balancing life with a new wife and young daughter.

Hurd has been quoted in The Wall Street Journal, The New York Times, Wired, The Straits Times and USA Today.

== Publications ==
- Chapter 3, "Trade" in The Next Chapter: Obama's Second-Term Foreign Policy, Programme Report, Chatham House (UK), Dormandy ed. (January 2013) [report considers some of the major challenges the Obama administration will face over the next four years. Topics covered include: the economy, trade, energy, environment, defence, China, the Middle East and North Africa, India, Afghanistan and Pakistan, Russia, and Europe.]
- "US Election Note: International Trade Policy after 2012" part of the Chatham House (UK) Americas Programme AMP PP 2012/02 (June 2012) [examining the likely trade policy of either a second-term Barack Obama administration or an incoming Mitt Romney administration].
- 2011 National Export Strategy: Powering the National Export Initiative, released by the Trade Promotion Coordinating Committee (June 2011).
- Report to the President on the National Export Initiative, released by the Trade Promotion Coordinating Committee (September 2010).
