= Premier Oil =

Oil company based in London

Premier Oil plc
- Type: Public
- Traded as: LSE: PMO
- ISIN: GB00B43G0577
- Industry: Oil
- Founded: 1934
- Headquarters: London, UK
- Key people: Roy Franklin, (Chairman); Anthony R. C. Durrant, (CEO)
- Revenue: $1,584.7 million (2019)
- Operating income: $455.0 million (2019)
- Net income: $164.3 million (2019)
- Website: www.premier-oil.com

Premier Oil plc was an independent UK oil company with gas and oil interests in the United Kingdom, Asia, Africa and Mexico. It was devoted entirely to the 'upstream' sector of the industry — the exploitation of oil and gas — as opposed to the 'downstream' refining and retail sector. It was listed on the London Stock Exchange until it was acquired by Chrysaor Holdings and then merged into Harbour Energy in March 2021.

== History ==
The company started trading in 1934 as the Caribbean Oil Company with the intention of pursuing oil and gas exploration and production activities in Trinidad. It was first listed on the London Stock Exchange in 1936 as Premier (Trinidad) Oilfields For the next two decades, the Company concentrated its attention on oil production in Trinidad.

The company acquired its first interest in the North Sea in 1971; it expanded its operations in the UK Continental Shelf throughout the 1970s, merging with the Ball and Collins North Sea Consortium in 1977 to gain significant interests in the North Sea as well as properties in Sudan and West Africa. In 1984, the company took a 12½% stake in the onshore oilfield at Wytch Farm in Dorset.

In the late 1980s and early 1990s, Premier enjoyed a series of exploration successes, notably the discovery of the Qadirpur gas field in Pakistan in 1990, the Fife and Angus fields in the UK Continental Shelf and the Yetagun gas field in Myanmar in 1992, as well as the offshore extension to Wytch Farm. The Yetagun transaction involved Premier entering into a deal directly with the Myanmar government.

In 1995, Premier acquired Pict Petroleum. As a consequence, Amerada Hess which had a substantial stake in Pict came to hold 25% of Premier's enlarged equity. From this point, Premier was participating in numerous North Sea oil and gas fields, including Fife, Fergus, Galahad and Scott.

In 1996, the Company diverted its attention to the Far east acquiring Sumatra Gulf Oil Limited, which had interests in Indonesia, and in 1997, went further buying Texaco's interests in Myanmar.

In 1998, Premier and Shell brought together their exploration and production interests in Pakistan to form a joint venture company, PSP (Premier & Shell Pakistan). In May 2001, Premier announced an asset swap with Shell which dismantled the partnership and, in September 2001, the formation of a new joint venture with Kufpec called Premier Kufpec Pakistan (PKP). Premier and Kufpec unwound the PKP joint venture in July 2007.

Petronas decided acquired a 25% stake in 1999. In November 1999 the Australian business was sold to Australian Worldwide Exploration (AWE). In January 2001, Premier Oil acquired a 23% shareholding in AWE. This was sold in June 2003.

A restructuring took place in 2002 which saw Petronas and Amerada Hess each give up their 25% holdings in Premier Oil in return for taking various Premier assets. Petronas received the Group's interest in Myanmar as well as stakes in Indonesian interests. Amerada Hess received a 23% stake in a key Natuna oil field in Indonesia.

In 2004 the company acquired a 75% stake in an oil interest in Vietnam.

In April 2014, Premier rejected two secret bid approaches from Ophir Energy which wanted to combine both firms into an oil exploration group for around £3 billion. Premier Oil's board unanimously rejected the bid.

In June 2014, the company received final approval from the UK Department of Energy and Climate Change for the development of the Catcher area oil and gas block in the North Sea, of which the company owns 50% and has operating rights. Oil was expected to be flowing by mid-2017.

In January 2016, its shares were suspended pending an announcement, regarding potential acquisition of assets by Premier which might be regarded as a reverse takeover. Trading recommenced on 1 February 2016, with the company announcing that it had agreed to acquire the whole of E.ON's UK North Sea assets for a net consideration of $120 million.

In July 2017, Premier Oil's shares rose nearly 40 percent on news it discovered potentially more than 1 billion barrels of oil off the coast of Mexico in the Zama-1 formation, a project in which it holds a 25 percent interest in the block alongside Talos Energy and Sierra Oil and Gas.

In March 2021, it was announced that the company would be acquired by Chrysaor Holdings. In March 2021, Chrysaor Holdings and Premier Oil were merged and absorbed into Harbour Energy. Harbour Energy had been the largest shareholder in Chrysaor Holdings.

== Operations ==
As of April 2017, the Company holds licence interests in the following countries:

- Brazil
- Falkland Islands
- Indonesia
- Mauritania
- Mexico
- Pakistan
- United Kingdom
- Vietnam

== See also ==
- List of companies based in London
