= Egan Junior High School =

Ardis G. Egan Intermediate School
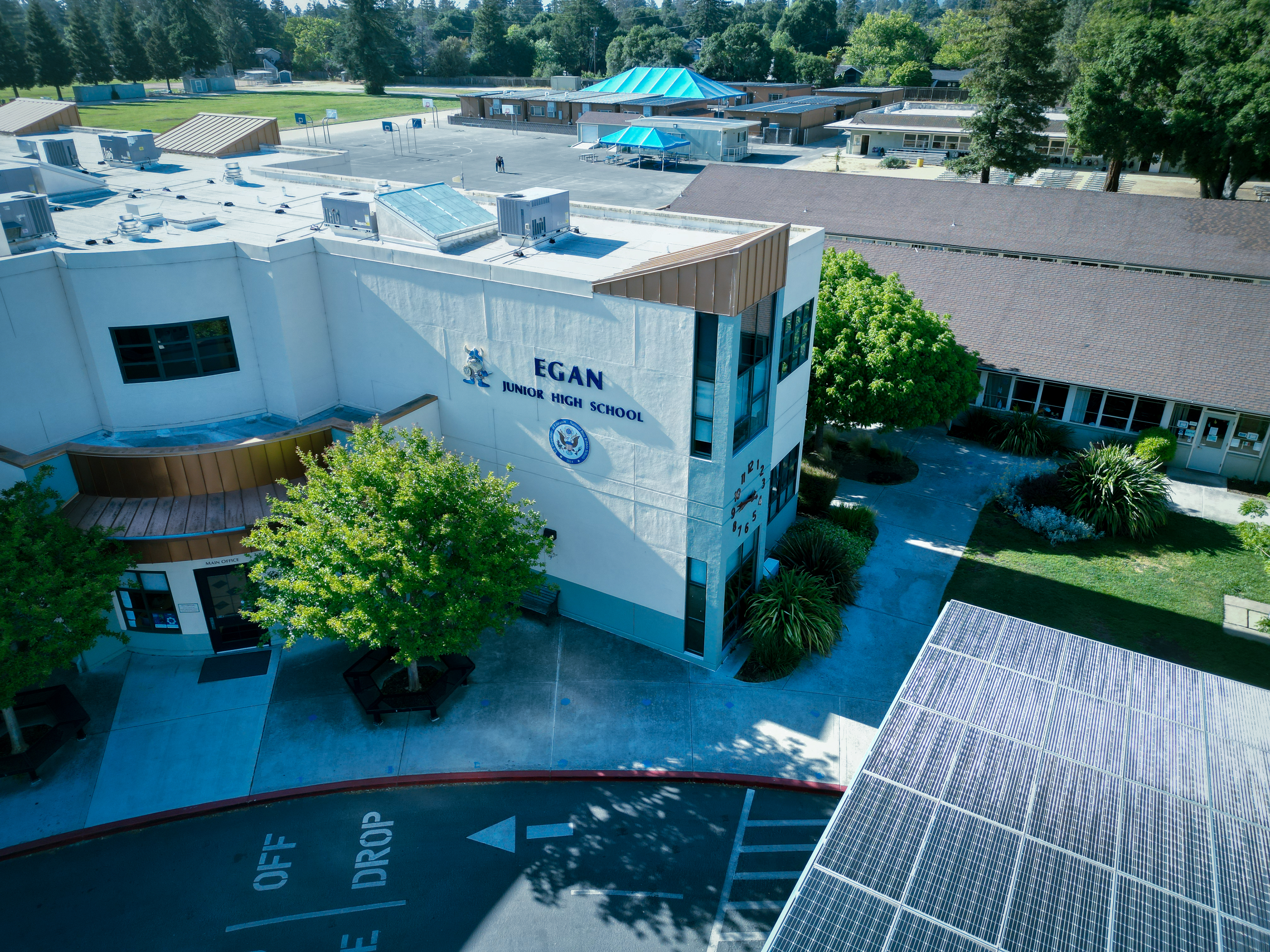
- Egan Junior High School in 2025

Location
- 100 W Portola Ave; Los Altos, California; U.S.
- Coordinates: 37°23′46″N 122°07′00″W

Information
- Type: Public
- School district: Los Altos School District
- Superintendent: Sandra McGonagle
- Principal: Lisa Taormina
- Grades: 7-8
- Campus: Suburban
- Colors: Blue and Gold
- Mascot: Viking
- Website: eganschool.org

Ardis G. Egan Junior High School is a public middle school for seventh graders and eighth graders in Los Altos, California. It is part of the Los Altos School District. Most of Egan's over five hundred students live in Los Altos and Los Altos Hills, and a few students live in Mountain View. Egan is named after Ardis Egan, the founder and former superintendent of the Los Altos School District.

Egan is mainly fed by local elementary schools of the same district: Almond, Santa Rita, Covington and Gardner Bullis. Egan has inherited these schools' high success rates, ranking as one of the top intermediate schools in the state. Most Egan students who remain within the public education system go on to study at Los Altos High School, which is in the Mountain View–Los Altos Union High School District.

== Awards and recognition ==
In 1988, 1990, and 2009, Egan was chosen as a California Distinguished School, and it has often scored high in STAR testing. It has been reported as the public school with the highest STAR test scores in California numerous times. From 1999 to 2002, Egan was ranked as the top junior high school in the state, based on its performance on the Academic Performance Index (API) Growth Reports.

== Education ==
Greatschools awarded Egan a 9/10 in 2018.

Egan is one of the few schools in the Bay Area that offers two Spanish classes: the regular Spanish 1A class and a Spanish Conversation class. Like all schools in the Los Altos School District, Egan has a musical program. Their band, orchestra, and chorus visit Disneyland every year to take part in a music workshop at the Imagination Campus.

Egan is well funded with a variety of electives, including Technology, including Robotics and Drones, Coding, Digital Art and Media, Orchestra, Languages, and Miscellaneous Items, such as Art, Yearbook, and Leadership. It also offers a variety of classes that allow students to learn teaching, secretary skills, and librarian skills. Besides, it has many well-funded main courses, Algebra, Science, History, English, and Physical Education. Los Altos's wealthy environment helps Egan's education funding.

Egan has sports programs for boys and girls in soccer, basketball, tennis, track and field, cross-country, volleyball, football, and others. Egan students also compete in the national MathCounts, AMC8 Math, and national Science Olympiad competition.

Students are given awards for a variety of achievements; the most notable of these awards is the "Block E", which is earned through sports, after-school activities, and service to the school.

== Miscellaneous ==
Bullis Charter School (BCS) also has its north campus on the east side of Egan's grounds bordering San Antonio Road. The Los Altos School District (LASD) offered to let BCS use this space (known at the time as the Egan camp school) from 1 May 2004. The charter school has been located here ever since. They are able to gain access to some of the facilities such as the main gym and track per request but are otherwise unpermitted to use those facilities.
