= Ben Bloom =

American football player (born 1982)

Tennessee Titans
- Title: Senior defensive assistant

Personal information
- Born: October 17, 1982 (age 44); Wellesley, Massachusetts, U.S.

Career information
- Position: Center
- High school: Wellesley (MA)
- College: Tufts (2001–2004)

Career history
- Tufts (2005–2007) Graduate assistant & defensive line coach; Harvard (2008) Assistant defensive line coach; Cleveland Browns (2009) Team operations assistant & quality control coach; Cleveland Browns (2010) Defensive quality control coach; Dallas Cowboys (2011–2013) Defensive quality control & assistant linebackers coach; Dallas Cowboys (2014) Assistant defensive line coach & defensive ends coach; Dallas Cowboys (2015) Defensive ends coach; Dallas Cowboys (2016–2017) Assistant coach & special projects; Dallas Cowboys (2018–2019) Linebackers coach; Cleveland Browns (2020) Senior defensive assistant; Cleveland Browns (2021–2022) Defensive run game coordinator; Cleveland Browns (2023) Defensive line coach; Tennessee Titans (2024–2025) Outside linebackers coach; Tennessee Titans (2026–present) Senior defensive assistant

Benjamin Myerow Bloom (born October 17, 1982) is an American football coach and former player who is the outside linebackers coach for the Tennessee Titans of the National Football League (NFL). He played college football for the Tufts Jumbos and later coached them, the Harvard Crimson and Dallas Cowboys.

== Early life ==
Bloom was born in October 17, 1982, and grew up in Wellesley, Massachusetts. He played sports at a young age, starting with soccer before switching to football in fourth grade. He attended Wellesley High School and played football there, helping them reach the Division II Super Bowl in consecutive years, losing in 1998 but winning it in 1999. After his graduation from Wellesley, Bloom attended Tufts University and played as an center for the Jumbos from 2001 to 2004.

== Coaching career ==
As a senior at Tufts in 2004, Bloom decided he wanted to enter coaching. His initial only offer after graduating from Tufts in 2005 was as an assistant for the WPI Engineers. Before he was to accept it, he received an offer from his alma mater, Tufts, to be a graduate assistant and defensive line coach, with the opportunity to continue his education and get a master's degree. He accepted Tufts' offer and worked in those positions from 2005 to 2007; he additionally worked during these years as a bouncer at a local bar and as a substitute teacher. He received his master's degree in education at Tufts.

In 2008, Bloom served one season as the assistant defensive line coach for the Harvard Crimson. He then joined the Cleveland Browns of the National Football League (NFL) in 2009 as a quality control coach and team operations assistant; his position was shifted to defensive quality control coach in 2010. He followed coach Matt Eberflus to the Dallas Cowboys in 2011, being named assistant linebackers coach and defensive quality control coach.

Bloom became the team's assistant defensive line coach and defensive ends coach in 2014 before moving solely to defensive ends coach in 2015. In 2016, he was named the Cowboys' assistant coach/special projects, in which he advised the head coach on game plans and schemes. He served two years in that role before receiving a job as linebackers coach in 2018. That season, he helped Leighton Vander Esch become the first Cowboys rookie linebacker to be named to the Pro Bowl.

In 2020, Bloom returned to the Browns and was named the team's senior defensive assistant. He was promoted to defensive run game coordinator in 2021. He then received a promotion to defensive line coach in 2023. That year, he was named by NFL.com as one of the "young NFL coaches to watch" for future head coaching positions.

On February 14, 2024, Bloom was named as outside linebackers coach for the Tennessee Titans. On February 11, 2026, follow g the hiring of new head coach Robert Saleh, Bloom was retained as a senior defensive assistant.
