= International Corporate Accountability Roundtable =

- Abbreviation: ICAR
- Formation: 2010; 16 years ago
- Type: Coalition
- Purpose: Campaigned for corporate accountability and restrict the sale of conflict minerals
- Location: Washington DC, United States
- Region served: Worldwide
- Members: EarthRights International, Human Rights Watch, Human Rights First, Global Witness and Amnesty International
- Official language: English
- Website: www.icar.ngo

The International Corporate Accountability Roundtable (ICAR) is a coalition of human rights groups focused on corporate accountability in the United States. Its mission is "to harness the power of the human rights community to identify and promote robust frameworks for corporate accountability, strengthen current measures and defend existing laws, policies and legal precedents."

ICAR's Steering Committee includes EarthRights International, Human Rights Watch, Human Rights First, Global Witness and Amnesty International.

== History ==
Formed in 2010, ICAR has campaigned for regulations that would restrict the sale of conflict minerals, in defense of the Foreign Corrupt Practices Act, and in support of a Civilian Extraterritorial Jurisdiction Act which would, in effect, extend the Military Extraterritorial Jurisdiction Act to include non-military contractors.

ICAR advocated for California SB 861, which passed in September, 2011 and made California the first US state to pass legislation restricting conflict minerals from the Democratic Republic of the Congo.

== See also ==
- Conflict minerals law
- Corporate accountability for human rights violations
- Corporatocracy
