= Wellesley High School =

Public high school in Wellesley, Massachusetts, United States

Location
- 50 Rice Street; Wellesley, Norfolk, MA 02482; United States

Information
- Type: Public
- Established: 1938
- Superintendent: David Lussier
- School code: 222285
- Principal: Jamie Chisum
- Teaching staff: 117.05 (FTE)
- Grades: 9–12
- Enrollment: 1,231 (2026–2027)
- Student to teacher ratio: 10.78
- Colors: Red & Black
- Athletics conference: Bay State Conference
- Mascot: Raider
- Newspaper: The Bradford
- Yearbook: The Wellesleyan

Wellesley High School is a public high school in Wellesley, Massachusetts, United States, educating students on grades 9 through 12. The principal is Jamie Chisum, who took the position in 2014 after the departure of Andrew Keough. As of 2025, the school serves 1231 students. In 2026 it was ranked the 35th best high school in Massachusetts and the 647th best public high school in the nation by U.S. News & World Report. In 2026 it was also ranked the 8th best Greater Boston high school by Boston Magazine.

== History and current state ==
The old school building of what was then named Gamaliel Bradford High School was originally built as a public works project in 1938 during the Great Depression, designed by Perry Shaw and Hepburn and built by M. Spinelli and Sons Co., Inc. The building has been modified with several additions throughout its existence, most recently with a new fitness center. The 1938 building was replaced in 2012 with a new building constructed in the former parking lot.

== Renewal and expansion ==
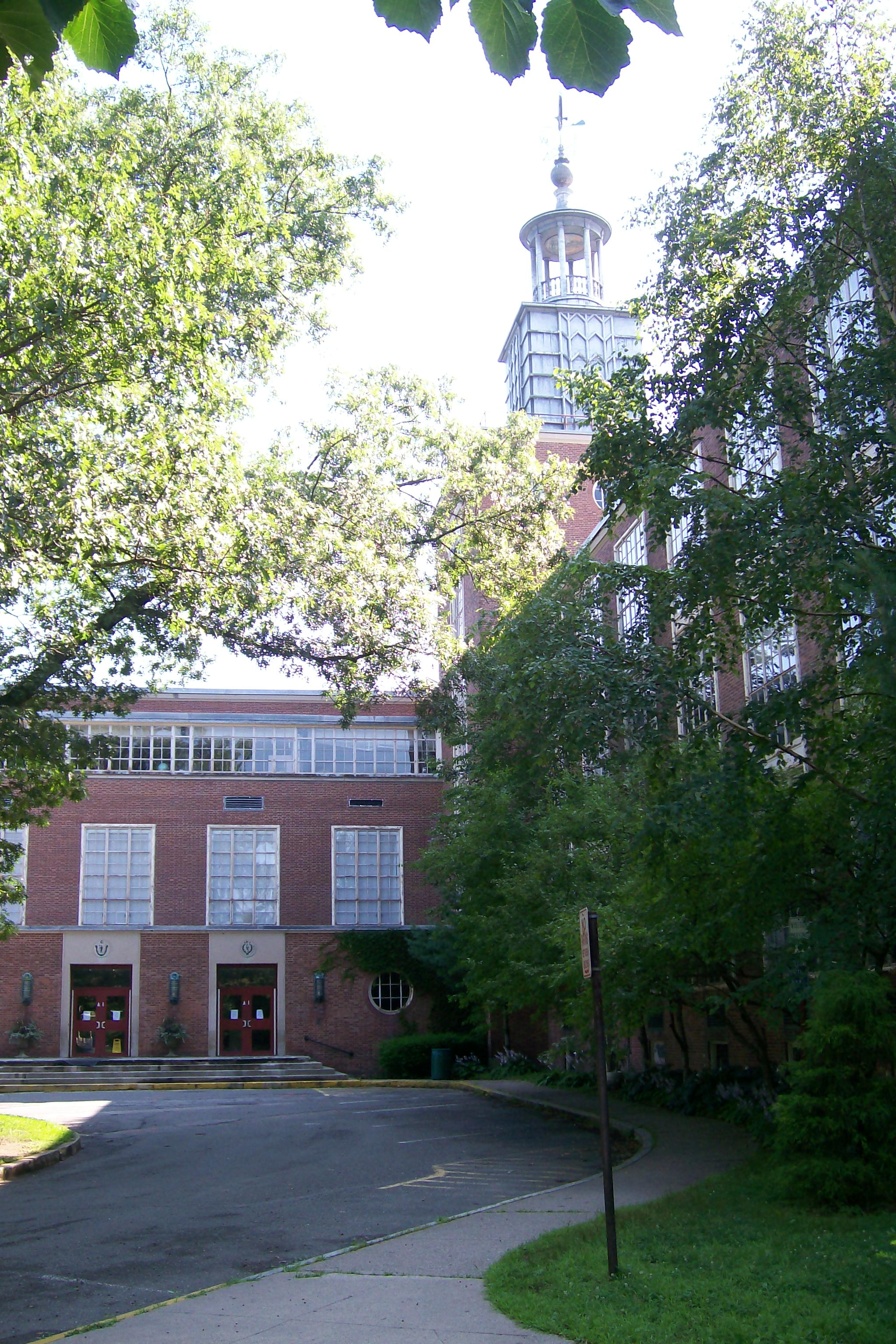
Wellesley High School in 2009 before demolition

The increasing size of the student body as well as the evolving nature of education challenged the capability of the 1938 building to meet the needs of the school community effectively and safely. In September 2005, the exploration of options for a new building or refurbishment was commenced by the town.

In October 2007, a public meeting was held to introduce several options for the expansion of the school, including renovation and extension of the existing building and its demolition and replacement by a completely new structure. The site was expanded by purchase of three adjacent properties in Seaver Street and transfer of publicly owned land.

On December 10, 2008, town voters approved the project by a nearly 2 to 1 ratio (5,026 YES to 2,869 NO), to build a new, state-of-the art high school on the parking lot next to the existing buildings. Site clearance started in August 2009 with the relocation of one house to a nearby site. Construction began March 2010 with an estimated completion date of September 2013. The new facility opened in February 2012, and the school held a gala to say goodbye to the old building, and alumni such as Billy Squier, Jane Curtin, and Biz Stone gave last rites in the school auditorium over a series of weekend concerts and get-together events in 2011.

After much analysis, the existing structure was declared to be a good example of the Art Deco style of architecture; however, it was found by the American Institute of Architects (A.I.A.) not to be a historically significant example and was demolished in 2011 and 2012. The state authorities held the final say in this ruling, but the A.I.A. review opened the door for the eventual knock-down and the final site plotting. The new structure, which opened to students in February 2012, incorporates some of the design features of the prior building and is limited in its visual impact to blend with the surrounding residential neighborhood. The total cost was estimated to be $130 million with $85 million of that total to be raised from State and Federal matching funds. However, the final project came in under budget at $90 million and opened 18 months ahead of schedule.

== Extracurricular activities ==
=== Academic Decathlon ===
Wellesley High School has an Academic Decathlon team. The team consistently makes it to the State Finals and has placed in the top 3 in Massachusetts for several seasons. In 2015, the team lost to the Acton-Boxborough High School for the state title. In 2021, Wellesley beat Acton-Boxborough to win States. Since then, Wellesley have won the State championship, totalling 5 consecutive wins.

=== Athletics ===
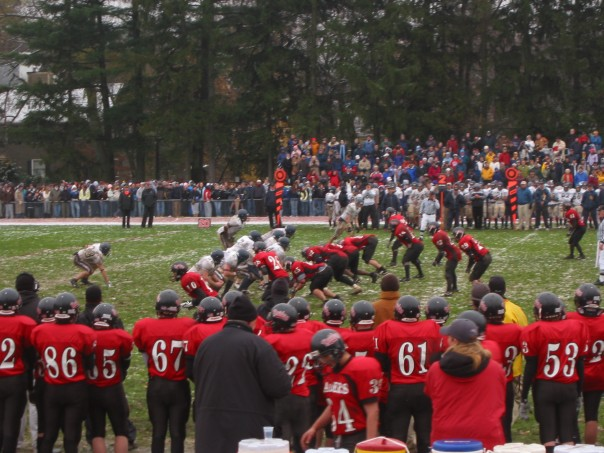
Raiders vs. Rockets in the 2005 Thanksgiving Day Game at Hunnewell Field in Wellesley

Wellesley High School athletic field

Wellesley High School is a member of the Bay State Conference and the Eastern Massachusetts Division of the Massachusetts Interscholastic Athletic Association (MIAA). A wide variety of sports are offered at Wellesley High School at the varsity, junior varsity, and freshmen levels. More than 70% of WHS students participate in sports at some point during their time at Wellesley High.

The rivalry between the Wellesley Raiders and the Needham High School Rockets is considered the oldest public high school football rivalry in the country, with 135 matchups since 1882. The game usually takes place on Thanksgiving Day, with Wellesley beating Needham 24–17 in the last iteration to improve their all-time record to 66–60–9.

State championships

In 2006, the Wellesley High School girls' ice hockey team won the state championship. In 2006, the Wellesley High School boys' lacrosse team won the Division 2 All State Championship. On March 15, 2008, the Wellesley High School girls' varsity basketball team defeated Millbury at the DCU Center in Worcester to win the State Basketball Championship. In June 2010, the Wellesley High School boys' tennis team defeated St. John's 5–0 to win its first ever Division 1 State Championship. In 2013, the Wellesley High School girls' tennis team defeated Notre Dame Academy to win the state championships. On June 10, 2016, the Wellesley High School girls' tennis team won the Division I State Championships. On November 19, 2016, Wellesley High School boys' cross country team, coached by former Olympian Tim Broe, won the Division I State Championships.

In 2021, the Coed Sailing team won their division in the MassBay Sailing League (MBL) and went on to come in first in the Team Racing Championships and the Fleet Race Championships. In 2022, the team won the Mass HS State Championship regatta to become the State Champions.

Varsity Sports in Wellesley for the 2014–2015 academic school year are as follows:

- Fall
  - Cheer
  - Football
  - Boys' Soccer
  - Girls' Soccer
  - Field Hockey
  - Boys' Cross Country
  - Girls' Cross Country
  - Girls' Volleyball
  - Girls' Swimming
  - Girls' Diving
  - Boys' Golf
- Winter
  - Boys' Basketball
  - Girls' Basketball
  - Boys' Indoor Track
  - Girls' Indoor Track
  - Boys' Ice Hockey
  - Girls' Ice Hockey
  - Boys' Swimming
  - Boys' Diving
  - Dance Team
  - Boys' and Girls' Alpine and Nordic Ski Team
  - Wrestling
  - Girls' Gymnastics
- Spring
  - Softball
  - Baseball
  - Boys' Outdoor Track and Field
  - Girls' Outdoor Track and Field
  - Boys' Tennis
  - Girls' Tennis
  - Boys' Lacrosse
  - Girls' Lacrosse
  - Boys' Volleyball
  - Sailing Team
  - Girls' Golf

== Co-curricular offerings ==
=== Performing arts ===
Wellesley High School is widely known for its performing arts department, which has reached state and national levels on a consistent basis. Some of the most notable works by the Wellesley High School performing arts department include the Keynote and Rice Street singer's involvement with the Boston Pops, as well as the band and orchestra programs.

- Band
  - 1 o'Clock Jazz Band – Winner of many different medals at the International Association for Jazz Education.
  - 2 o'Clock Jazz Band – The 2 o'clock Jazz Band was a finalist at the Essentially Ellington Jazz Band Competition and Festival in New York City for the second year in a row. The group has been accepted as a finalist again in 2009 for the third time. They were also accepted in 2011, their fourth time. They won first place at the 41st Annual Berklee Jazz Festival in 2009, their second consecutive victory there. They won again in 2014. They have won a gold medal at the MAJE state finals for each year since 2002.
  - Concert Band
  - Wind Ensemble – Since the origin of the WHS Wind Ensemble, it has won the gold medal at the MICCA state finals several consecutive years, and has performed at both Mechanics Hall in Worcester and Symphony Hall in Boston.
- Orchestra (strings)
  - The orchestra won a gold medal at MICCA in 2009 and performed at Symphony Hall in March.
  - The Honors Chamber Orchestra won a gold medal at MICCA for many consecutive years and performed both in Mechanics Hall, Worcester and Symphony Hall, Boston.
- Choral Program
  - Concert Choir - Wellesley High School's unauditioned choral group
  - Keynote Singers - Select Ensemble of 50 singers who are known for their beautiful, engaging, and energetic arrangements. They appeared at the "Boston Pops: Home Alone In Concert" in 2013 and 2018 alongside the Rice Street Singers and the Boston Pops Orchestra, conducted by Keith Lockhart.
  - Rice Street - Select Ensemble of singers, known for jazz arrangements. They have won numerous awards alongside the Keynote Singers at the all state level..
  - Overtones - the class for Altos and Sopranos
  - Subharmonics - the class for Basses and Tenors
- Drama Program
  - Four levels of acting classes are offered.
  - The Wellesley High School Drama Society has won the Massachusetts High School Drama Guild Festival and advanced to New Englands five times in the past ten years. Their most recent win was in 2010 with their production of the self-scripted Blüdpayne VII: A Fistful of Blüdpayne. In 2007, Wellesley won with their production of Dark of the Moon, and in 2006, with the self-scripted Der Waffle Haus, Ergo Leggo My Ego.
- Technical Theatre
  - Stagecraft and Stagecraft Intensive classes are offered.

=== Journalism ===
The Bradford is the Wellesley High School newspaper. The Journalism class is responsible for publishing new issues. Red Ink is an arts and literary magazine with student submitted poetry, stories, photography, and otherwise.

== Associated programs ==
=== Child Lab ===
Child Lab is a developmentally appropriate laboratory preschool for 3-, 4-, and 5-year-olds located on the ground floor of Wellesley High School. Since its inception in 1979, the Lab School has enrolled 18 children each year. It is an elective in which high school students enroll to learn about the development of young children and methods to approach optimum learning for them at different ages and stages of early childhood development.

== Notable alumni ==
- Eddie Barry (ice hockey), 1938, Boston Bruins hockey player
- David H. Locke, 1945, politician and lawyer
- Sylvia Plath, 1950, poet
- Shaun Fitzmaurice, c. 1960, former MLB baseball player
- Rock Perdoni, c. 1966, former professional football player
- Billy Squier, 1968, musician
- Richard Preston, 1972, novelist
- R. Nicholas Burns, 1974, diplomat
- Damon Santostefano, 1977, film director
- David Grinspoon, 1977, astrobiologist and author
- Stephen Burns, 1978, musician
- Phil Laak, 1982, professional poker player
- Lori Kirkland Baker, 1983, comedy writer/producer
- Katie Redford, 1986, lawyer and activist
- Joe Hurd, 1987, lawyer and venture capitalist
- Greg Yaitanes, 1988, film director
- Adam Haslett, 1988, author
- Derek B. Miller, 1988, novelist
- Jay Harrington, 1989, actor
- Michaela Watkins, 1990, comedian
- Biz Stone, 1992, entrepreneur, co-founder of Twitter
- Aneesh Raman, 1997, political advisor and former CNN war correspondent
- Emily Jabbour, 1999, mayor of Hoboken, NJ
- Ben Bloom, 2001, football coach
- Alex Spiro, 2001, trial lawyer
- Michelle Chamuel, 2004, singer
- Christopher Leggett, film producer
- Nate Freiman, 2005, MLB baseball player
- Blake Dietrick, 2011, WNBA basketball player
- Bijan Mazaheri, 2012, distance runner
- Zack Ziegler, 2013, co-founder and CTO of OpenEvidence.
- Will Griffin, 2017, bassist in Couch
- Michael Thorbjornsen, 2020, professional golfer
- Blake Lothian, 2021, NASCAR driver
