= Doe v. Unocal Corp. =

- Court: United States Court of Appeals for the Ninth Circuit
- Full case name: John Doe v. Unocal Corporation et al
- Decided: September 18, 2002
- Citation: 395 F.3d 932 (9th Cir. 2002)

Case history
- Prior history: 110 F.Supp.2d 1294 (C.D.Cal. 2000)
- Subsequent history: Opinion vacated and rehearing en banc granted, 395 F.3d 978 (9th Cir. 2003); Appeal dismissed and District Court opinion vacated, 403 F.3d 708 (9th Cir. 2005)

Court membership
- Judges sitting: Harry Pregerson, Stephen Reinhardt, A. Wallace Tashima

Case opinions
- Majority: Pregerson, joined by Tashima
- Concurrence: Reinhardt

Laws applied
- Alien Tort Statute

Doe v. Unocal, 395 F.3d 932 (9th Cir. 2002), opinion vacated and rehearing en banc granted, 395 F.3d 978 (9th Cir. 2003), was a lawsuit filed against Unocal for alleged human rights violations.

== Events ==
In September 1996, four Burmese villagers filed suit against Unocal and its parent company, the Union Oil Company of California under the Alien Tort Claims Act (also known as the Alien Tort Statute), and in October 1996, another fourteen villagers also brought suit. The suits alleged various human rights violations, including forced labor, wrongful death, false imprisonment, assault, intentional infliction of emotional distress and negligence, all relating to the construction of the Yadana gas pipeline project in Myanmar, formerly Burma. In September and October 2000, some of those plaintiffs also filed lawsuits in the Superior Court of California for many of the same state-law tort claims.

== Case ==
EarthRights International, the Center for Constitutional Rights, Paul Hoffman, Hadsell & Stormer, and Judith Brown Chomsky served as co-counsel to the plaintiffs.

In 1997, a U.S. federal district court in Los Angeles agreed to hear Doe v. Unocal. The Court ruled that corporations and their executive officers can be held legally responsible under the Alien Tort Claims Act for violations of international human rights norms in foreign countries, and that U.S. courts have the authority to adjudicate such claims. In 2000, the district court dismissed the case on the grounds that Unocal could not be held liable unless Unocal wanted the military to commit abuses, and that plaintiffs had not made this showing.

Plaintiffs appealed this decision, and on September 18, 2002, a three-judge panel of the United States Court of Appeals for the Ninth Circuit reversed portions of the district court's decision, allowing the lawsuit against Unocal to go forward. 395 F.3d 932. However, in February 2003, the Ninth Circuit Court vacated the panel decision and agreed to rehear the appeal before an eleven-judge en banc panel.

Following a ruling in the California state court actions that would have permitted those cases to proceed toward a trial as to Unocal's liability, and shortly prior to when the case was to be argued before the Ninth Circuit en banc court in December 2004 (the argument had been delayed in order to address the impact of the recent U.S. Supreme Court ruling in Sosa v. Alvarez-Machain), the parties announced that they had reached a tentative settlement. Once the settlement was finalized in March 2005, the federal appeal was withdrawn and the state cases were voluntarily dismissed. According to a joint statement released by the parties, "the settlement will compensate plaintiffs and provide funds enabling plaintiffs and their representatives to develop programs to improve living conditions, health care and education and protect the rights of people from the pipeline region. These initiatives will provide substantial assistance to people who may have suffered hardships in the region." Subsequent to the settlement, the district court opinion from 2000 was also vacated.
