= Yadana pipeline =

Natural gas pipeline in Myanmar and Thailand

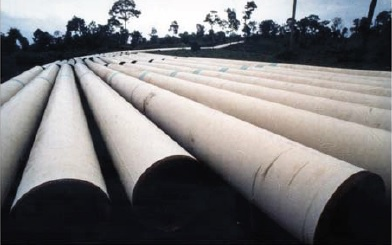
Yadana pipeline during construction

The Yadana pipeline is a transboundary natural gas pipeline linking Myanmar's Yadana gas field to Thailand. Built from 1995 to 1998 with the support of Thailand through the Petroleum Authority of Thailand, the project was subject to controversy over human rights abuses against minority groups in Myanmar and environmental concerns in Thailand. It supplies about 25 percent of Thailand's natural gas demand.

== Construction of Thai pipeline ==
=== Contractor and Building Time ===
In January 1997, the Tasco Mannesmann Joint Venture (TMJV a Thai-German Company Joint Venture), won the pipeline contract which included the procurement, construction and commissioning of the pipeline and related facilities, as well as the design of the Supervisory Control and Data Acquisition (SCADA) and Telecommunications system including a Fiber optic cable system. The Yadana Gas Pipeline in Thailand was built in 1997–1998.

=== Design, Detail Engineering and Route selection ===
The Petroleum Authority of Thailand (now PTT) was responsible to provide the entire engineering (except for SCADA) including the detailed engineering for the pipeline project. For this work Nova Gas International and OGP Technical Services of Malaysia won a consulting engineering and project management contract for the Yadana Gas pipeline in November 1995. According to the reference document, Nova Gas/OGP was responsible for the route selection, the detailed engineering of the pipeline and all related facilities including issuing the Bid documents. With issuing the Tender documents for Bidding to Contractors the engineering was not finished and it was completed only during the execution phase of the project incorporating all the changes ordered by PTT. The design life for the pipeline is 40 years which is consistent with PTT's other pipeline systems. Furthermore, as PTT's Engineer and Consultant Nova Gas/OGP was responsible for the entire construction supervision of the Yadana Gas Pipeline Project.

=== The Pipeline System ===
The pipeline has a diameter of 42 inches and is around 240 kilometers long and it has a total number of 12 Block Valve Stations that includes 6 Scraper Facilities, an operations and maintenance center including a gas meter station and a SCADA Telecommunications system that was connected to the Petroleum Authority of Thailand's (PTT) existing SCADA system. After its completion the Yadana Gas Pipeline secured PTT with an alternative source of gas supply form Myanmar in addition to the Gulf of Thailand, on which PTT had totally relied upon.

=== Starting & Ending Location of the Pipeline ===
The Yadana gas pipeline system connects with the 36 inch Yadana Myanmar gas pipeline at Ban I-tong, a small former mining village located in a forest mountain area, on the border in Kanchanaburi province in the Thong Pha Phum district at KP-000. At Scraper/Block Valve Station 1 located 350 meter away from the border the pipeline increases its diameter to 42 inch. It than transports the gas to the Ratchaburi Power Plant located at the end of the 240 km long pipeline. PTT's Operation and Maintenance Center is located at Pipeline Kilometer KP 233.2 at Ratchaburi adjacent to Highway 4. Scraper/Block Valve Station #7 including the later built Compressor Station is the home for the Region VIII Gas Pipeline Operations Division Kanchanaburi

=== Terrain of the Pipeline ===
The pipeline routes through a widely differing types of terrain such as along roads, through paddy fields, sugar cane fields etc. and mountainous areas. The basic right of way for the pipeline, varying in width from 5 meters in road reserves to 10 meters in privately owned areas, and 12 to 20 meters in forestry areas, was provided by PTT, as was the land for the construction of other facilities. Additional working space was where required obtained by TMJV. This was done especially in areas of road reserves where the right of way was very narrow.

=== Construction ===
TMJV used – as planned at the beginning of the Project – two main pipeline construction spreads. Both spreads were sufficiently equipped and have had mechanized welding crews. The mobilization of the imported construction equipment, local equipment and manpower was achieved as planned. Later in the project TMJV expanded the number of construction Spreads due to delays that were mainly due to land unavailability. The accelerated recovery measures that were implemented by the TMJV worked successfully and most of the lost time was recovered and the anticipated Project delay was significantly minimized

=== Results ===
The gas as it transported by the 42 inch Yadana Gas Pipeline is used for many purposes in Thailand and is a part of PTT's Gas Value Chain. According to PTT the Yadana Gas Pipeline is a highly sophisticated technical system and complies to the Thailand Quality Award (TQA) criterion. PTT did win a TQA award in 2010! The Yadana Gas Pipeline deliveries about 25% of Thailand's Natural Gas demand. Thailand's total power generation is dominated by 58% of natural gas according to the referenced Bangkok Post Article dated on 14. October 2019 .

August 2020 marked the 22nd anniversary of the Petroleum Authority of Thailand (PTT) 42-inch Natural Yadana Gas Pipeline operation from Ban I Tong to Ratchaburi. Since this time no operation pipeline accident was reported.
