= Bullis Charter School =

Location
- 102 West Portola Avenue (North Campus) - 1124 Covington Road (South Campus); Los Altos, California 94022; United States; 37.396800°N 122.115499°W

Information
- Other name: BCS
- Type: Charter school
- Established: 2003
- School district: Santa Clara County Office of Education
- Grades: K - 8
- Enrollment: 1025
- Campus type: Suburban
- Colors: Yellow, Blue
- Mascot: Bear
- Website: www.bullischarterschool.com

Bullis Charter School (BCS) is a charter school in Los Altos, California, USA, for grades kindergarten through eighth. As the Santa Clara County Office of Education charters the school, BCS operates independently of the Los Altos School District (LASD). The school is funded in majority from Los Altos School District funding, regardless of residence of students, and parent donations solicited in excess of $6k per student per year.

== History ==
BCS was founded by local residents as a reaction to the closure of Bullis Elementary School in Los Altos Hills (this school later re-opened as Gardner Bullis School in 2008).

The Los Altos School District (LASD) conducted a parcel tax campaign in 2002, known as Measure A, stating that the funds were needed to maintain schools and their quality. After Measure A passed with a 70% vote, the LASD Board of Trustees initiated a process to select a school for closure. In response to the closure, a citizen's committee was formed to determine which school would be closed. They ultimately selected the Los Altos Hills school, considering its size, declining enrollment, and other factors.

The community's reactions were diverse: most parents accepted the closure and supported the District, while another group collaborated with the District for several years to reopen the closed school, achieving this goal five years later. A third group established Bullis Charter School.

After the local school district twice rejected the school's original charter application, the school is now chartered by the County of Santa Clara, which was a circumvention of the Los Altos District and broader Los Altos community wishes.

The school is now in two locations shared with Egan Junior High School (K-8) and Blach Intermediate School (K-5). However, BCS is actively fighting being moved to a new campus to ease the burden on these two middle schools. LASD is obligated to provide space for BCS, out of their overall budget.

While many parents are interested in the "alternate" approach of the school, many have raised questions about the need for this in a district which is already considered high performing. Bullis is also known for its frequent changes and ongoing lawsuits that can seem in conflict with their stated mission.

== Controversies ==
Unlike traditional public schools, anyone who resides in the state of California can choose to apply to Bullis Charter School by submitting for enrollment. However, the reality of their enrollment statistics, according to their charter renewal submissions, is that almost 100% of spots are offered to those who reside in the Los Altos School District. If there are more students interested than there are spots available, then, by law, there is a random public lottery to determine who is admitted.

According to the school's enrollment procedures found on their website, enrollment preferences are applied based on a prescribed hierarchy within each grade level. One such preference, specifically for those students residing in the attendance area for the original Bullis-Purissima Elementary School, was a source of some controversy as it was perceived as giving special priority to children from certain affluent parts of Los Altos and Los Altos Hills. On May 6, 2021, Bullis Charter was threatened with closure unless it "cures" its diversity issue.

Both subpar teacher quality and subpar employment practices have been noted in comparison to the LASD neighborhood schools. LASD teachers, on average, have 4 to 5 more years of teaching experience than BCS teachers. BCS teachers have consistently less tenure, over double the rate of attrition, and fewer credentials than LASD teachers.

Bullis has repeatedly fought LASD's efforts to find a permanent home for their charter school. Sites in Sunnyvale and Mountain View have been offered and declined by BCS, which insists they need to stay in Los Altos School District boundaries. Their motivations for staying in LASD's boundaries despite tensions are often speculated to be related to maintaining affluent, high performing students to boost their performance KPIs. BCS's performance indicators benefit from serving less than half the socio-economically disadvantaged and IEP-having/high needs students as the LASD serves. In November 2024, Los Altos voters passed the largest bond in the peninsula, Measure EE, for $350M, partially reserved to be spent building BCS a new campus at the former Kohl's site in Mountain View.

== Key Litigation and Legal Issues ==
Facilities and Prop 39 (2009–2012): A long-standing dispute centered on whether the Los Altos School District provided "reasonably equivalent facilities" under Proposition 39. This saga led to multiple lawsuits over several years.

Threat of Closure (2021): The County Board of Education threatened to revoke the charter if the school did not improve its student diversity.

Federal Investigation (2024): A complaint regarding bullying and discrimination at the school spurred a federal investigation.

Racial Discrimination and Enrollment (2024–2025): The Santa Clara County Board of Education accused BCS of under-enrolling Hispanic English-language learners, students with disabilities, and socio-economically disadvantaged students. In response, BCS filed a lawsuit claiming the county was discriminating against its Asian student majority, however BCS did update their enrollment lottery priorities to include low income families as a preference.

== Timeline ==
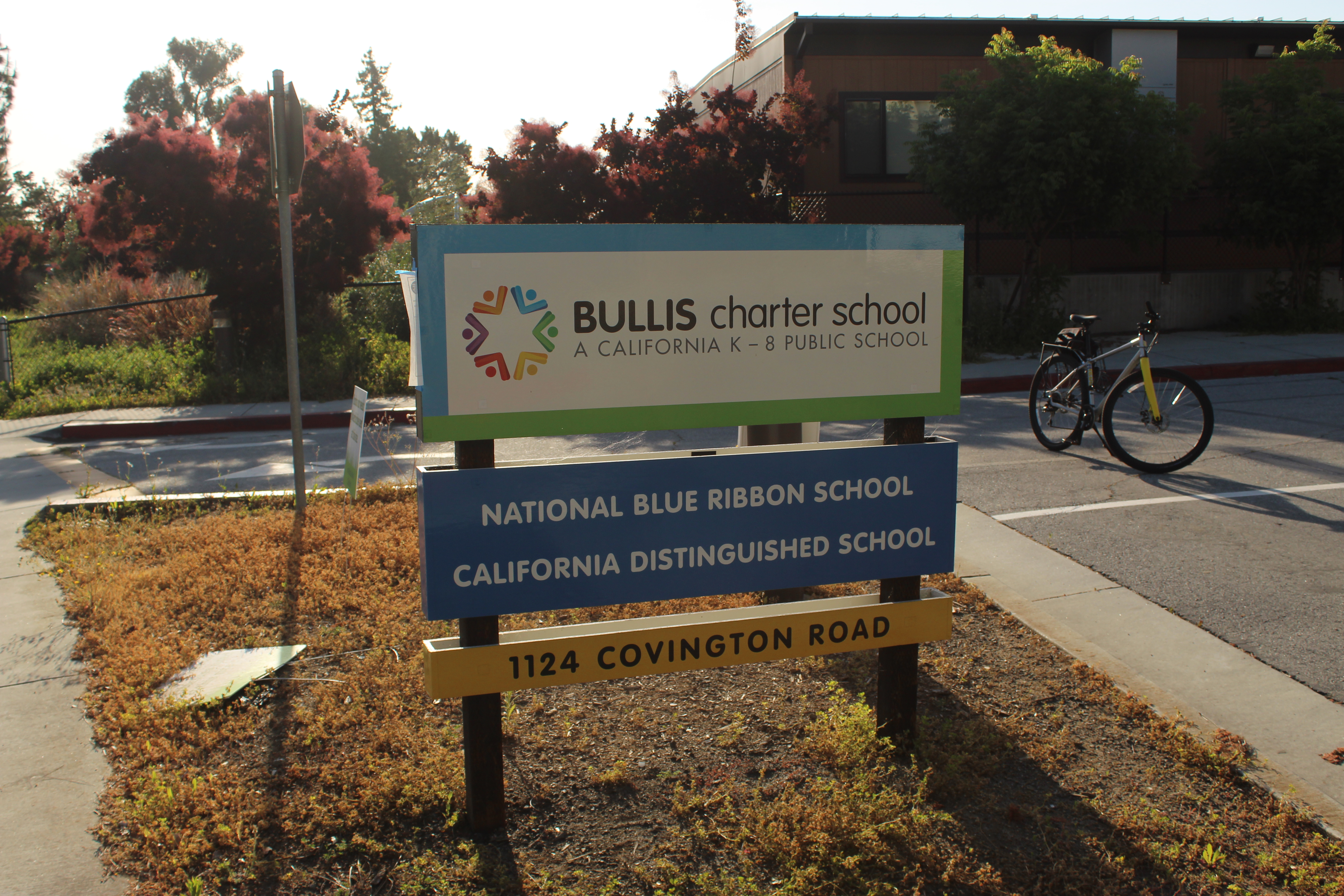
Bullis Charter School (Covington Road location)

On September 3, 2003, the Santa Clara Office of Education approved the school charter and became the sponsoring agency of BCS.

On March 15, 2004, the LASD offered the portable classrooms at Egan Junior High School to BCS beginning on May 1, 2004. BCS accepted and has been there ever since.

On February 21, 2007, the Santa Clara County Board of Education approved the renewal of the BCS charter for five more years in a 6-0 vote.

On April 9, 2008, BCS was given a California Distinguished School Award.

In 2008, BCS was granted WASC Accreditation.

In November 2008, the Santa Clara County Board of Education ruled that BCS can add a 7th and 8th grade.

In August 2010, BCS opened its doors to their first ever 7th grade class.

== Academic Performance & Recognition ==
School Year	BCS	LASD
2004-2005	973	949
2005-2006	960	960
2006-2007	968	954
2007-2008	964	956
2008-2009	971	959
2009-2010	988	965
2010-2011	984	969
2011-2012	994	969
2012-2013*	990	961

Since its inception, BCS has been among the highest-scoring charter schools in the state of California. BCS' Academic Performance Index (API) scores remained consistently near the 1,000 point range. Although this is outstanding performance, this was also consistent with the surrounding public schools in Los Altos.

BCS has twice been named a California Distinguished School by the California Department of Education. Once in 2008 and again in 2014, this time for its STEAM (Science, Technology, Engineering, Art, and Math) program and Focused Learning Goals (FLGs) for every student. BCS was recognized for having an Exemplary Visual and Performing Arts program. Also in 2014, BCS was named a National Blue Ribbon School by the U.S. Department of Education. Following the statewide transition to new assessment and accountability systems, BCS was recognized by the California Department of Education in 2016 as a California Gold Ribbon School.
