= Corporate accountability for human rights violations =

Holding corporations accountable for either direct conduct or complicity for human rights violations has become an increasing area of attention in promoting human rights. Multinational corporations in particular have been singled out as important figures in the maintenance of human rights given their economic status and international dimension. Currently, there is no mechanism at the international level which can hold corporations legally accountable. Reliance has instead been placed upon a number of soft law instruments, including the United Nations Guiding Principles on Business and Human Rights. With the potential exception for redress under the Alien Tort Statute, corporations are only legally accountable for human rights violations under the municipal law of the nation in which the violation is alleged to have occurred or the company is based.

== Multinational corporations and human rights ==
Multinational corporations emerged in the 1990s as one of the most significant challenges to the dominance of states in the social and economic international order. In 2013, 37 of the top 100 economies in the world were corporations, with Wal-Mart Stores annual revenue exceeding the GDP of all but the top 27 states in the world. As a result, there have been increasing concerns over the role multinationals have in promoting and protecting international human rights. Under an orthodox view of international law, the obligation to protect human rights lies with the nation state. The power of multinationals has been recognized as diminishing the ability of weaker states to enforce human rights.

Furthermore, concerns have been raised over the operation of multinationals in countries which have a poor human rights record. Numerous cases such as Doe v. Unocal Corp. alleging gross human rights violations carried out by multinationals or their associates in countries such as Burma (Myanmar) exist. Whilst concern has been raised over the role multinationals have played in human rights violations, recognition has also been given to the fact that multinationals have the potential to promote human rights in states with a poor track record beyond the ability of other nation states.

== Accountability under the International human rights framework ==
Under the international human rights framework, corporations can only be held directly accountable for human rights violations which constitute international crimes as provided for in the Rome Statute of the International Criminal Court.

Under the orthodox view, States are the primary “subjects” of international law, and whilst International Organizations hold international legal personality, individuals and corporations hold limited standing. There has been extensive debate on what status multinational corporations should hold in international law. Those arguing that multinationals should hold rights and duties do so on the ground that this is necessary given their size and influence. Those who argue against the imposition of international law upon multinationals contend that to do so would mean conveying rights, which would inevitably enhance the influence and power they hold. Recent developments have seen the articulation of the human rights obligations of corporations but no enforceable regulatory mechanism exists at the international level.

=== United Nations Guiding Principles on Business and Human Rights ===
The United Nations Guiding Principles on Business and Human Rights stand as the authoritative statement on the human rights standards corporations should adhere to. The Principles consist of a three-pillar framework: protect, respect, and remedy. The Principles do not create new law or impose obligations on corporations; instead, they provide what should constitute best practice. The protect pillar retains the orthodox position that is the responsibility of states to protect human rights. The respect pillar holds that corporations should respect human rights, undertaking due diligence to ensure that their conduct does not infringe upon any rights. The remedy pillar calls for remedies both judicial and non-judicial to be provided for those whose human rights have been infringed by a corporation. The response to the Principles has been mixed.

The OECD, European Commission, and the United Nations Global Compact have all endorsed the Principles as providing clarity and a point of reference for future developments. The United Nations Human Rights Council formally endorsed the Principles shortly after their publication. The Principles have not been met with universal favor. The International Federation for Human Rights, which represents numerous human rights groups, criticized the Principles for failing to provide an effective remedy for victims on an international level and failing to recognize the responsibility of states for the actions of their companies abroad. Although currently non-binding, there has been speculation by scholars that the Principles could provide a platform for a binding instrument or solidify into customary international law therefore creating legally binding obligations.

=== OECD Guidelines for Multinational Enterprises ===
The OECD Guidelines for Multinational Enterprises is a soft-law instrument containing information on the standards of conduct Multinational corporations should aim to meet. “They provide non-binding principles and standards for responsible business conduct in a global context consistent with applicable laws and internationally recognised standards.” Section IV of the updated 2011 version of the Guidelines deals directly with human rights and reiterates much of the content present in the United Nations Guiding Principles on Business and Human Rights. As such, the Guidelines directly endorse the UN Guiding Principles. Section IV provides:

"States have the duty to protect human rights. Enterprises should, within the framework of internationally recognised human rights, the international human rights obligations of the countries in which they operate as well as relevant domestic laws and regulations:

1. Respect human rights, which means they should avoid infringing on the human rights of others and should address adverse human rights impacts with which they are involved.
2. Within the context of their own activities, avoid causing or contributing to adverse human rights impacts and address such impacts when they occur.
3. Seek ways to prevent or mitigate adverse human rights impacts that are directly linked to their business operations, products or services by a business relationship, even if they do not contribute to those impacts.
4. Have a policy commitment to respect human rights.
5. Carry out human rights due diligence as appropriate to their size, the nature and context of operations and the severity of the risks of adverse human rights impacts.
6. Provide for or co-operate through legitimate processes in the remediation of adverse human rights impacts where they identify that they have caused or contributed to these impacts."

-- OECD Guidelines for Multinational Enterprises (2011), Section IV

The above six points mirror the three pillars of the UN Guiding Principles; State duty to protect, corporate responsibility to respect, and access to remedy. The Guidelines require participating states to establish National Contact Points (NCP). Allegations from individuals can be brought forward to the NCP. These are referred to as specific instances. The merits of the claim are then addressed by the NCP and if a case is found then an investigation will be undertaken. Mediation may take place between the company in question and the complainant as one of the final stages in the process. If a company is found to be in breach of the guidelines then a Final Statement will be produced outlining the violations of the Guidelines which occurred along with an impact assessment.

Although remedies for any breaches of human rights are sought they cannot be enforced under the Guidelines. Amnesty International has commented that the Guidelines provide a "lens for examining business conduct with regard to human rights." In this sense it has been argued that the OECD Guidelines have the potential to promote a degree of accountability. Amnesty International in its Briefing for the UK National Contact Point advised on the potential repercussions of a Final Statement for companies found to be non-compliant. Reputation, ability to operate, and value of shares may all be detrimentally affected by a finding of non-compliance. Amnesty believes that this may act as a deterrent, leveling the playing field for those companies who ensure they adhere to human rights standards. The rationale behind this being that the cost-benefit relationship is altered in favour of adherence to human rights.

=== Company codes ===
Many companies have taken it upon themselves to adopt their own codes of conduct which are self-imposed ethical standards. Most contain provisions on human rights. The Business and Human Rights Resource Centre maintains a list of companies which have a human rights policy in place. Whilst codes promote accountability, critics have argued that given their voluntary nature, and generally speaking lack of enforcement mechanisms, they are of limited value.

=== Alien Tort Statute ===
Several organisations and commentators have recognised that many victims of human rights violations at the hands of multinational corporations will not have a means of redress in the country the violation has occurred. As such victims often rely on the exercise of extraterritorial jurisdiction. In Europe jurisdiction is granted to hear civil claims against via Resolution 44/2001 of the European Council but this requires that the corporation in question be domiciled in a Member State. The Alien Tort Statute is unique in that it in principle provides Federal courts in the United States of America with near universal jurisdiction to hear claims alleging serious violation of customary international law or the "law of nations", the only nexus required being that the defendant be present in the United States. However, the application of the statute to claims made against multinational corporations for human rights violations occurring abroad remains uncertain. Corporate liability for extraterritorial harms has been allowed by the Seventh, Ninth, Eleventh and D.C. Circuits but an increasing number of procedural limitations restricting access of foreign plaintiffs to redress have emerged.

The 2013 decision of the Supreme Court in Kiobel v. Royal Dutch Petroleum Co. ruled that there is a presumption against the extraterritorial application of the Alien Tort Statue. The Business and Human Rights Resource Centre cites Kiobel as a turning point in the use of the Alien Tort Statue as a means for redress for human rights violations at the hands of corporations, and part of a wider trend globally in which avenues for extraterritorial claims are closing.

=== Corporate Sustainability Due Diligence Directive ===
The Corporate Sustainability Due Diligence Directive 2024 (2024/1760) is a directive in European Union (EU) law to require due diligence for companies to prevent adverse human rights and environmental impacts in the company's own operations and across their value chains. It was adopted in 2024.

Following its formal adoption in June 2024, this legislation marked a pivotal shift in the Union's approach by transitioning corporate responsibility from a voluntary "soft law" framework into a binding statutory obligation grounded in the fundamental values of Article 2 of the Treaty on European Union.

Implementation is strategically targeted, focusing on companies with significant economic footprints to ensure a proportionate regulatory impact. Under Recital 28, the directive’s obligations specifically apply to Union companies employing more than 1,000 employees with a net worldwide turnover exceeding €450 million. Rather than guaranteeing an absolute absence of adverse impacts, the framework is defined as an "obligation of means" (obligation de moyens), requiring firms to implement measures that reflect the severity and likelihood of identified risks. This structured legal approach ensures that sustainability is no longer a peripheral ethical choice, but a core component of compliant business operations, providing affected parties with enhanced access to justice and civil remedies within European courts.

== See also ==
- Corporatocracy
