= Total Denial =

- Directed by: Milena Kaneva
- Produced by: Milena Kaneva
- Music by: Nikolay Ivanov
- Release date: March 1, 2006 (One World Film Festival)
- Running time: 92 minutes
- Country: United States
- Languages: Burmese and English

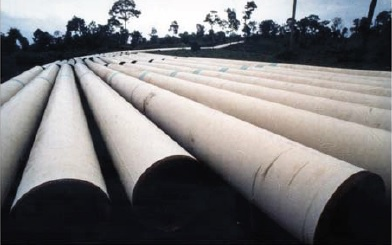
Yadana pipeline during construction

Total Denial is a 2006 documentary film about fifteen Burmese villagers going up against oil giants UNOCAL and Total as they build the Yadana Pipeline.

== Critical reception ==
The film was reviewed by The New York Times, and Variety.
