= Los Altos School District =

School district in California

Address
- 201 Covington Road Santa Clara County Los Altos, California; United States

District information
- Type: Public School District
- Grades: K-8
- Established: 1909; 117 years ago
- Superintendent: Sandra McGonagle
- Schools: 9
- Budget: $40,270,195 USD
- NCES District ID: 0622650

Students and staff
- Students: 3,576 (2020–2021)
- Teachers: 193.28 (FTE)
- Staff: 217.92 (FTE)
- Student–teacher ratio: 18.5:1
- Colors: Blue

Other information
- Website: www.lasdschools.org

Los Altos School District (LASD) serves the elementary and intermediate educational needs of Los Altos, Los Altos Hills, Mountain View and Palo Alto, United States. The superintendent is Sandra McGonagle, and the Assistant Superintendent is Carrie Bosco.

== History ==
The desire of the local residents to have a free public education for their children led to the formation of the Los Altos School District in February 1909. During this time, 4.5 acres (18,000 m^{2}) of land along San Antonio Road was purchased and the construction of the first school in the region, San Antonio School, was built. It catered to students in grades K through 8, and was the only academic institution until the ending of World War II.

In the years 1948 through 1961, the city was faced with an increasing student population and state mandates against having single schools with greater than 800 students. In 1948, the district annexed lands and purchased the old Purissima School site (in Los Altos Hills) from the neighboring Palo Alto School District. During this time of expansion, the district included sixteen different schools.

Enrollment peaked in 1966, then slowly declined. The original San Antonio School was demolished and sold, while the number of facilities dwindled. The district currently consists of nine open regular schools, comprising seven elementary and two intermediate schools.

== API Scores ==
Los Altos School District students' test scores were among the highest in California, with an average Academic Performance Index (API) score of 966 for elementary schools and 975 for intermediate schools in 2011.

Los Altos School District consistently scores high on the state examinations; four elementary schools place in the top twenty-five in the state, while both Egan and Blach score within the top fifteen middle schools. Although this success can be partially contributed to favorable demographics, the San Jose Mercury News states that "Los Altos elementary schools do well even against schools with similar demographics".

== API Scores 2005-2013 ==
SCHOOL	2013 API	2012 API	2011 API	2010 API	2009 API	2008 API	2007 API	2006 API	2005 API
Almond Elementary	911	972	966	962	962	1000	964	971	1000
Covington Elementary	974	981	983	980	946	950	928	938	963
Gardner Bullis Elementary	947	958	964	957	968*	n/a	n/a	n/a	n/a
Loyola Elementary	954	965	964	963	966	970	972	965	965
Oak Avenue Elementary	987	983	983	980	983	978	969	982	964
Santa Rita Elementary	941	956	957	964	966	956	952	957	939
Springer Elementary	955	961	946	954	963	956	948	961	960
Blach Intermediate	958	968	971	964	944	931	950	952	952
Egan Junior High	976	979	978	968	954	958	958	961	947
AVERAGE	961	968	969	965	959	956	954	960	949

*School opened

== Intermediate schools (7-8) ==
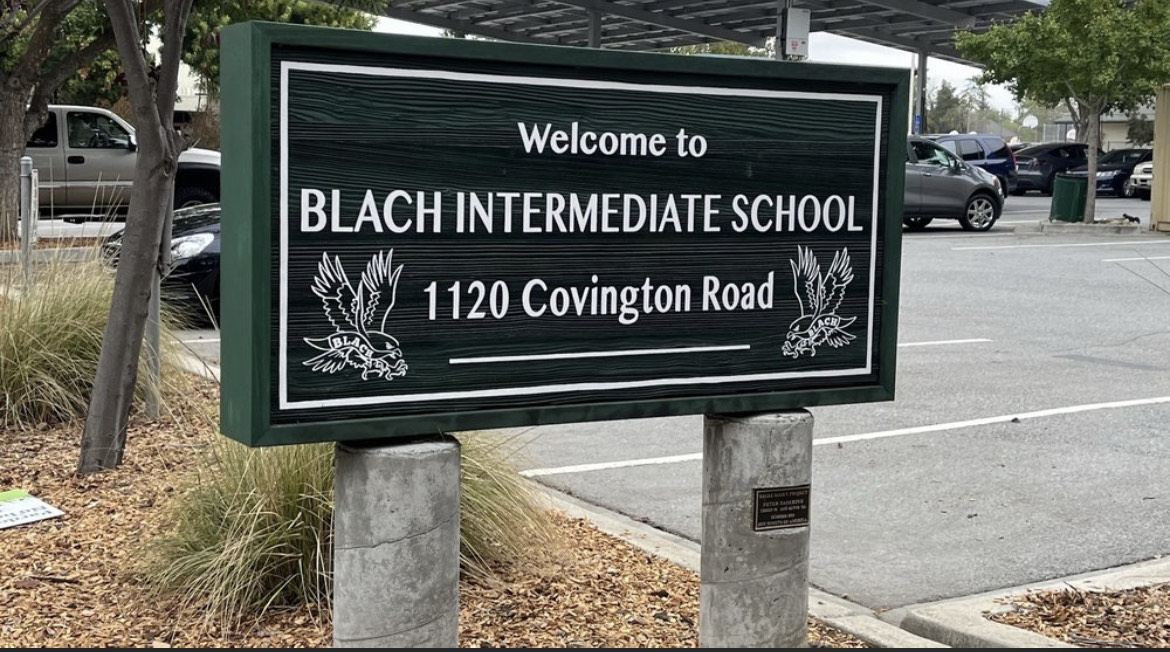
Blach Intermediate School

=== Georgina P. Blach Intermediate School ===
Blach Intermediate School is located at 1120 Covington Rd., Los Altos, CA 94024. The school mascot is the falcon.

The 2018–19 school year had 499 students in attendance. The student population was 54% male and 46% female. Its racial makeup was 50% White, 32% Asian, 12% Two or More Races and 5% Hispanic.

Blach was founded in 1957. It was honored as a California Distinguished School in 1990 and 1992, and as a National Blue Ribbon School in 2014.

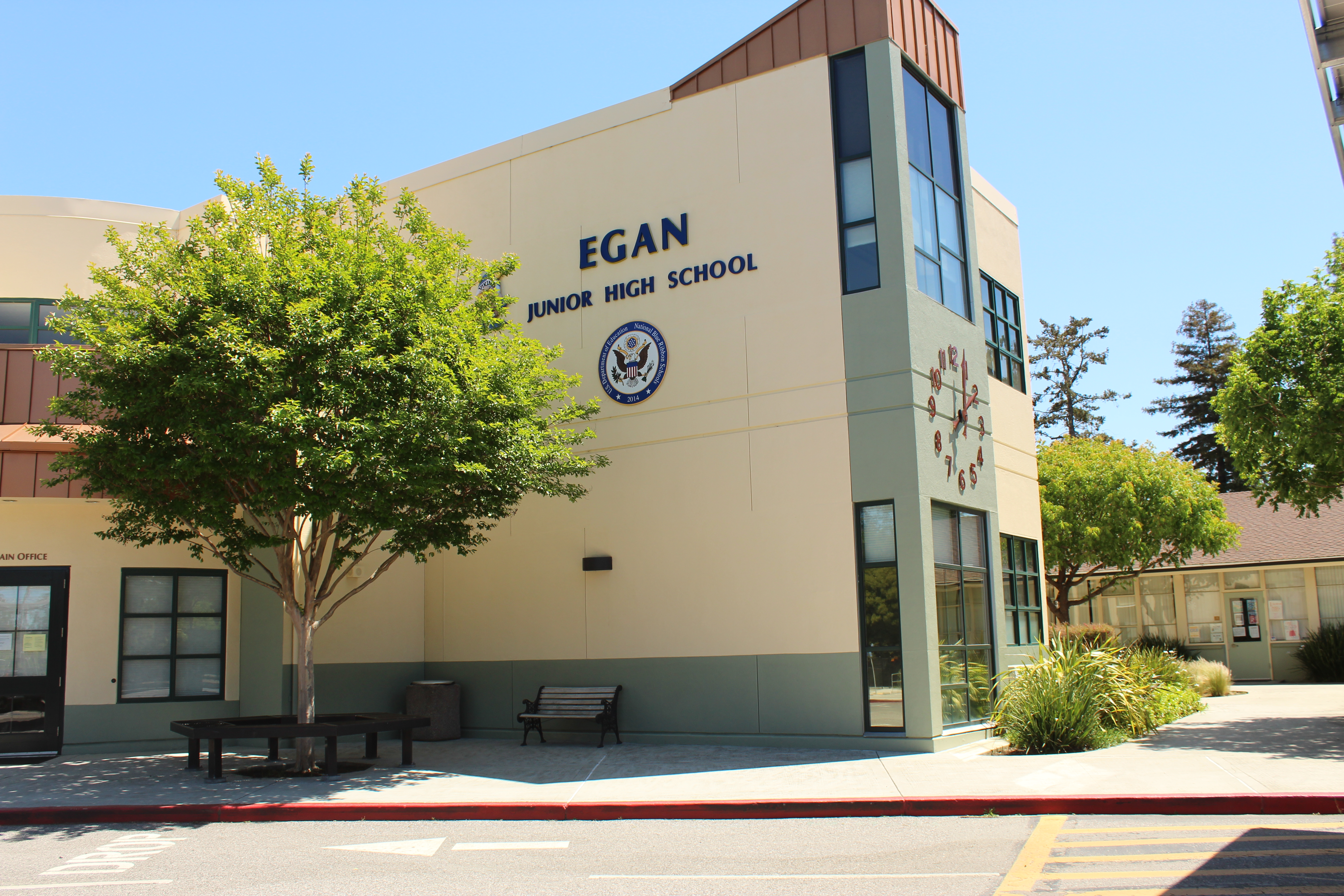
Egan Junior High School

=== Ardis G. Egan Junior High School ===
Egan Junior High School is located at 100 West Portola Ave, Los Altos, CA 94022. The school mascot is the Viking.

The 2018–19 school year had 585 students in attendance. The student population was 51% male and 49% female. Its racial makeup was 45% White, 35% Asian, 10% Two or More Races and 10% Hispanic.

Egan was founded in 1957. In 1988, 1990, and 2009, Egan was chosen as a California Distinguished School, and it was honored as a National Blue Ribbon School in 2014. From 1999 to 2002, Egan was ranked as the top junior high school in the state, based on its performance on the Academic Performance Index (API) Growth Reports.

== Elementary schools (K-6) ==
- Almond Elementary School
- Gardner Bullis Elementary School
- Covington Elementary School
- Loyola Elementary School
- Oak Avenue Elementary School
- Santa Rita Elementary School
- Springer Elementary School

Bullis Charter School is not chartered by LASD, but through the Santa Clara County Office of Education. LASD provides facilities to Bullis Charter School in accordance with California law.

== Charter school lawsuits ==
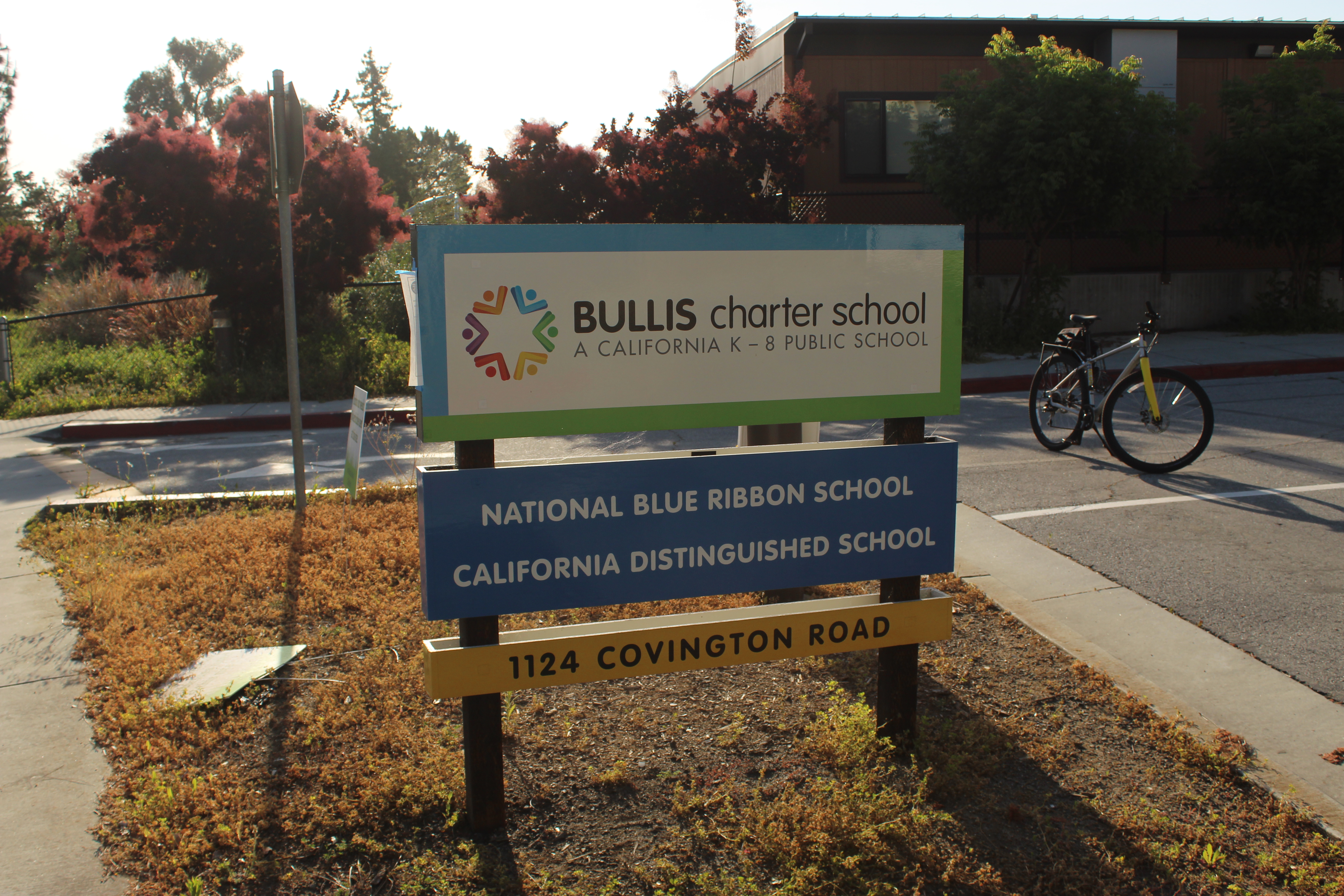
Bullis Charter School

The District has been sued several times by Bullis Charter School (BCS). After winning two lawsuits, the District lost a case in the appellate court of California. The court found the District to have violated Proposition 39 in regard to providing "reasonably equivalent" facilities for BCS and was cited for having undercounted by over 1,000,000 square feet. BCS was founded as a reaction to the LASD board's decision on 10 February 2003 to close Bullis-Purissima Elementary School and has been at odds with LASD administration since the school's inception.

Bullis Charter School and LASD currently have come to a 5-year "cease-fire" agreement over facilities.
