= Yadana gas field =

Burmese gas field in the Andaman Sea

- Location of the Yadana gas field
- Country: Myanmar
- Region: Andaman Sea
- Location: Mottama offshore area
- Offshore/onshore: Offshore
- Coordinates: 15.123°N 94.783°E
- Operator: TotalEnergies
- Partners: TotalEnergies (31.2%); Chevron Corporation (28.3%); PTT Public Company Limited (25.5%); Myanma Oil and Gas Enterprise (15%)

Field history
- Discovery: 1980
- Start of development: 1995
- Start of production: 1998

Production
- Current production of gas: 8×10^{9} m^{3}/a (280×10^{9} cu ft/a)
- Recoverable gas: 150×10^{9} m^{3} (5.3×10^{12} cu ft)

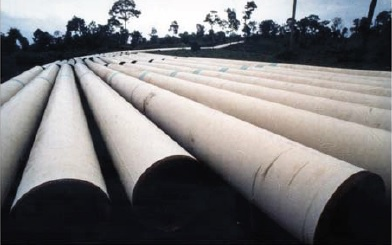
Yadana pipeline during construction

The Yadana gas field is an offshore gas field in the Andaman Sea. It is located about 60 kilometres (37 mi) offshore to the nearest landfall in Myanmar. The gas field is an important source of revenue for the Myanmar Army. Gas from Yadana is used to generate about 8 percent of the electricity in neighbouring Thailand and around half of all electricity in Myanmar’s largest city, Yangon.

== Description ==
The Yadana gas field contains more than 150 billion cubic meters of natural gas and has an expected field life of over 30 years. In 2009, the output averaged 780 million cubic feet per day (22×10^{6} m^{3}/d).

The gas field lies around 1,300 metres (4,300 ft) beneath the seabed in the water depth around 40 metres (130 ft). The offshore production complex consist of two remote wellhead platforms, one bridge-linked wellhead platform, a production platform, a living quarters platform, and a medium compression platform. Produced gas is exported through two pipelines. The first is the Yadana Gas Pipeline, a 409-kilometre-long (254 mi) pipeline runs 346 kilometres (215 mi) underwater from Yadana to Daminseik at the coast. From there, a 63-kilometre (39 mi) onshore section runs to the Thai border at Pilok. The onshore section crosses a region inhabited by the Karen, a minority ethnic group hostile to the government. Construction of the pipeline was completed in 1998 and it cost US$1.2 billion. This pipeline has capacity of 500 million cubic feet per day (14×10^{6} m^{3}/d).

The second, 287-kilometre-long (178 mi) pipeline from Yadana to Yangon was inaugurated on 12 June 2010. The 24-inch (610 mm) pipeline has 151-kilometre-long (94 mi) offshore and 136 kilometres (85 mi) long onshore sections. The pipeline has capacity of 150 million cubic feet per day (4.2×10^{6} m^{3}/d).

== Project company ==
The Yadana gas field and pipelines are operated by TotalEnergies, a French energy group, with Chevron Corporation, a United States-based company, as its junior partner along with PTT, a Thai state-owned oil and gas company, and Myanma Oil and Gas Enterprise (MOGE), a state-owned enterprise of Myanmar. Operator of the gas field is TotalEnergies. TotalEnergies has working interest of 31.2%, Chevron 28.3%, PTT 25.5%, and MOGE 15%.

As of January 2022, TotalEnergies has announced that they will withdraw from the Yadana project as the operator and joint venture partner, and PTT Exploration and Production Public Company Limited (PTTEP) will take over. The nomination of PTTEP as the new operator has been appointed by the remaining partners in this project. The operatorship transfer is expected to be completed on July 20, 2022.

Under the Production Operating Agreement (POA), TotalEnergies’ share will be allocated proportionately to the remaining joint venture partners with no commercial value. After the effective date of TotalEnergies’ withdrawal, PTTEPI will hold 37.0842% participating interest, while a subsidiary of Chevron, Unocal Myanmar Offshore Company Limited will hold 41.1016%, which is the largest participating interest in the project.

== Controversy ==
The Yadana project has been subject to much criticism in the international community, particularly because companies of democratic nations invested in a regime that has been noted for its human rights violations. The State Law and Order Restoration Council came under intense scrutiny for their human rights abuses during the construction of the pipeline and their involvement in the project led to a lawsuit being filed against Unocal. Evidence collected by EarthRights International suggests that villagers are routinely forced to work in various guises. One former soldier from the 273 battalion said : "We were told it was a 30-year project and the country got half, and the foreigners got half of the benefit. We ask the villagers to carry shell ammunition, food and supplies. During the portering the soldiers treat porters not so good. I do not want to mention about these bad things so much since I myself I have done it to these people as well at that time." Troops routinely force civilians to work for them and those who refuse are often beaten, tortured or sometimes killed. Since early 2009 Burmese soldiers have ordered villagers to build a new police camp. "The Yadana project ushered in the Burmese army and the Burmese army continues to provide security for the companies and the project. The Total company has been complicit in abuses," said Matthew Smith of ERI.

The 2006 documentary Total Denial depicted the controversy surrounding the construction of the Yadana pipeline.

== See also ==
- TotalEnergies
- Unocal Corporation
- Alien Tort Claims Act
- Yetagun gas field
