= Stiff Little Fingers discography =

- Studio albums: 10
- EPs: 4
- Live albums: 17
- Compilation albums: 11
- Singles: 19

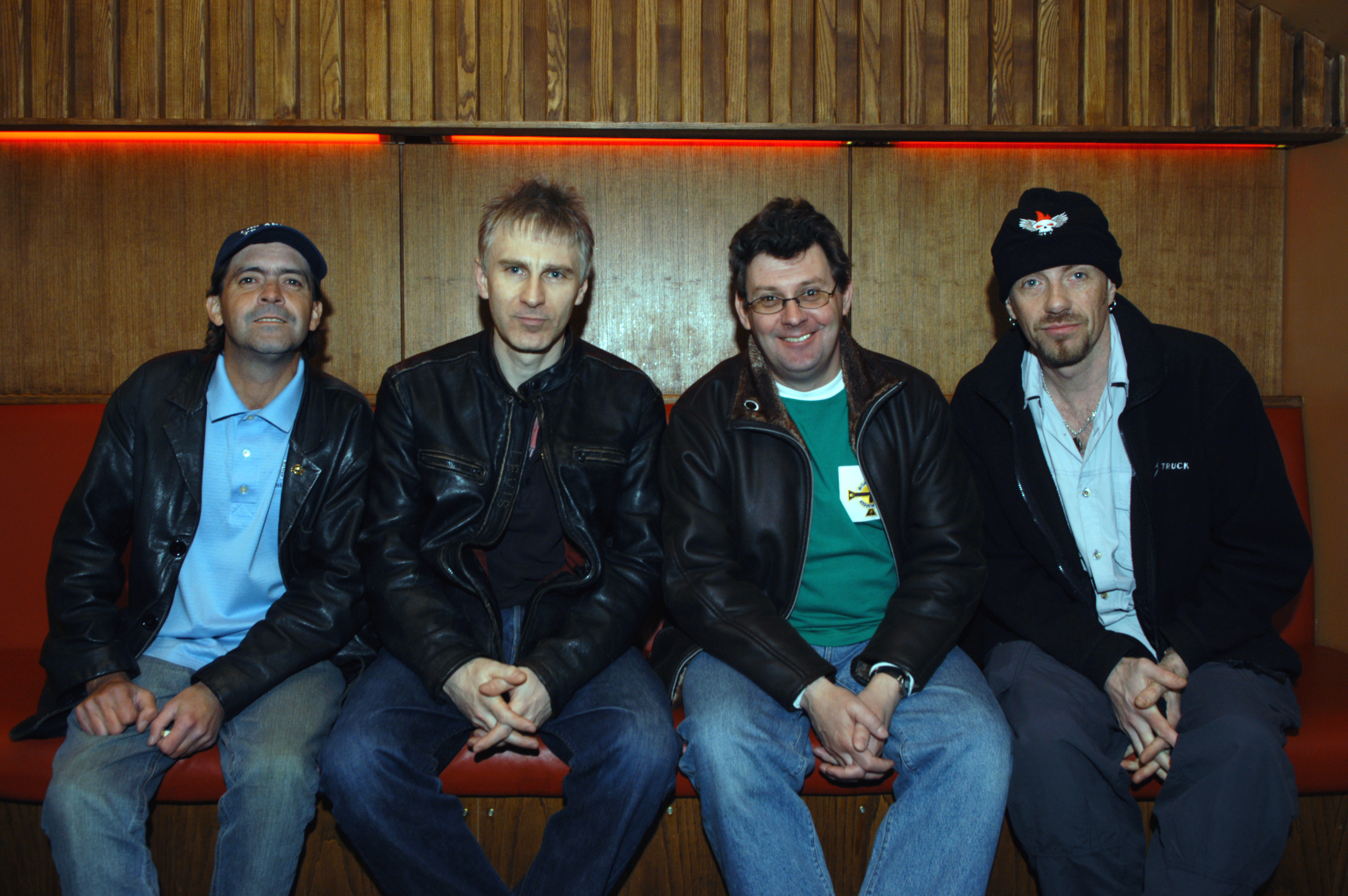
Photo of the musical group Stiff Little Fingers.

This is the discography of Northern Irish punk rock band Stiff Little Fingers.

== Albums ==
=== Studio albums ===
Title	Album details	Peak chart positions			
Title	Album details	UK	UK Indie	NZ	SWE
Inflammable Material	Released: 2 February 1979; Label: Rough Trade; Formats: LP, MC	14	2	25	—
Nobody's Heroes	Released: 7 March 1980; Label: Chrysalis; Formats: LP, MC	8	—	—	26
Go for It	Released: 17 April 1981; Label: Chrysalis; Formats: LP, MC	14	—	18	—
Now Then...	Released: September 1982; Label: Chrysalis; Formats: LP, MC	24	—	—	43
Flags and Emblems	Released: 30 September 1991; Label: Essential!; Formats: CD, LP, MC	—	—	—	—
Get a Life	Released: 21 February 1994; Label: Chrysalis, Warner Bros.; Formats: CD, MC	89	—	—	—
Tinderbox	Released: 30 June 1997; Label: Abstract Sounds; Formats: CD, MC	—	—	—	—
Hope Street	Released: 15 February 1999; Label: EMI; Formats: CD	127	—	—	—
Guitar and Drum	Released: 11 August 2003; Label: EMI; Formats: CD	—	—	—	—
No Going Back	Released: 15 March 2014; Label: Rigid Digits; Formats: CD, 2xCD, LP, digital download	28	4	—	—
"—" denotes releases that did not chart.

=== Live albums ===
Title	Album details	Peak chart positions	
Title	Album details	UK	UK Indie
Hanx!	Released: 12 September 1980; Label: Chrysalis; Formats: LP, MC	9	—
Live and Loud!!!	Released: March 1988; Label: Link; Formats: 2xLP	—	6
No Sleep 'til Belfast	Released: 16 May 1988; Label: Kaz; Formats: CD, 2xMC	—	—
See You Up There!	Released: 28 March 1989; Label: Virgin; Formats: CD, 2xLP, MC	—	—
Live in Sweden	Released: October 1989; Label: Limited Edition; Formats: CD, LP	—	—
The Peel Sessions Album	Released: 4 December 1989; Label: Strange Fruit; Formats: CD, LP, MC	—	—
Greatest Hits Live	Released: 3 February 1992; Label: Streetlink; Formats: CD	—	—
Fly the Flags	Released: 16 November 1992; Label: Dojo; Formats: CD	—	—
BBC Radio 1: Live In Concert	Released: 23 August 1993; Label: Windsong; Formats: CD	—	—
Pure Fingers	Released: 27 March 1995; Label: Dojo; Formats: CD	—	—
Live	Released: 9 February 1998; Label: E2; Formats: CD	—	—
Live In Aberdeen (1979)	Released: 17 November 2003; Label: EMI Gold; Formats: CD	—	—
Rockers	Released: 14 October 2016; Label: Secret; Formats: CD+DVD	—	—
Best Served Loud	Released: November 2016; Label: An Approved Recordings; Formats: CD, 2xLP	—	—
Suspect Device	Released: 6 October 2017; Label: Secret; Formats: CD+DVD	—	49
Live at Rockpalast 1980 & 1989	Released: 23 July 2021; Label: MIG; Formats: 2xCD+DVD	—	22
Hope Street Live	Released: 28 June 2024; Label: Secret; Formats: CD+DVD	—	—
"—" denotes releases that did not chart.

=== Compilation albums ===
Title	Album details	Peak chart positions
Title	Album details	UK
All the Best	Released: February 1983; Label: Chrysalis; Formats: 2xLP, MC	19
B's, Live, Unplugged & Demos	Released: 1995; Label: Dojo; Formats: CD	—
Stand Up and Shout	Released: 12 October 1998; Label: Catfish; Formats: CD; Compilation of live tracks	—
Tin Soldiers	Released: May 1999; Label: Harry May; Formats: CD	—
Live Inspiration	Released: March 2000; Label: Recall 2cd; Formats: 2xCD	—
Back Against the Wall – The Essential Fingers Collection	Released: 16 April 2001; Label: EMI; Formats: CD	—
The Complete John Peel Sessions	Released: 26 August 2002; Label: Strange Fruit; Formats: CD	—
The Radio 1 Sessions	Released: December 2002; Label: Strange Fruit; Formats: CD	—
Wasted Life – Live	Released: April 2004; Label: Shakedown; Formats: 2xCD+DVD	—
The Story So Far	Released: 26 March 2007; Label: EMI Gold; Formats: 2xCD	—
Assume Nothing. Question Everything. The Very Best of Stiff Little Fingers	Released: 12 March 2012; Label: Music Club Deluxe; Formats: 2xCD	—
"—" denotes releases that did not chart.

== EPs ==
Title	EP details	Peak chart positions			
Title	EP details	UK	UK Indie	IRE	NZ
Gotta Gettaway	Released: 1980; Label: Celluloid; Formats: 12"; France-only release	—	—	—	—
£1.10 or Less	Released: January 1982; Label: Chrysalis; Formats: 7", 12"	33	—	24	34
The Peel Sessions	Released: September 1986; Label: Strange Fruit; Formats: 12"	107	16	—	—
The Wild Rovers E.P.	Released: 1989; Label: Virgin; Formats: 12", CD	83	—	—	—
"—" denotes releases that did not chart or were not released in that territory.

== Singles ==
Title	Year	Peak chart positions		Albums
Title	Year	UK	UK Indie	Albums
"Suspect Device"	1978	—	17	Inflammable Material
"Alternative Ulster"	1978	—	11	Inflammable Material
"Gotta Gettaway"	1979	—	38	Nobody's Heroes
"Straw Dogs"	1979	44	—	Non-album single
"At the Edge"	1980	15	—	Nobody's Heroes
"Nobody's Hero" / "Tin Soldiers"	1980	36	—	Nobody's Heroes
"Back to Front" / "Mr. Coal Fire Man"	1980	49	—	Non-album single
"Just Fade Away"	1981	47	—	Go for It
"Silver Lining"	1981	68	—	Go for It
"Talkback"	1982	—	—	Now Then...
"Bits of Kids"	1982	73	—	Now Then...
"The Price of Admission"	1983	95	—	Now Then...
"No Sleep 'til Belfast"	1988	181	—	Live and Loud!!!
"The Last Time"	1989	—	—	Non-album single
"Beirut Moon"	1991	—	—	Flags and Emblems
"Can't Believe in You"	1994	97	—	Get a Life
"Harp"	1994	—	—	Get a Life
"Get a Life" (US-only release)	1994	—	—	Get a Life
"Guitar and Drum"	2003	—	—	Guitar and Drum
"—" denotes releases that did not chart or were not released in that territory.
