= All the Best (Stiff Little Fingers album) =

Compilation album by Stiff Little Fingers
- Released: February 4, 1983
- Recorded: 1978–1983
- Genre: Punk rock, pop punk
- Length: 46:17 (Disc 1); 50:63 (Disc 2)
- Label: Chrysalis

Stiff Little Fingers chronology
Now Then... (1982)	All the Best (1983)	Flags and Emblems (1991)

Professional ratings
Review scores
Source	Rating
Allmusic	4.5/5 stars

All the Best is a compilation album by the band Stiff Little Fingers, released in 1983.

The album consists of the A- and B-sides of all the band's singles and EPs recorded and released between 1978 and 1983. It was originally released to coincide both with the release of the band's final single "Price of Admission" and with their two "farewell shows" which took place in February 1983. The band reformed in 1987 and released further singles and the tracks on this album would later form a substantial part of the compilation album Anthology, released in 2002.

All the Best peaked at No. 19 on the UK Album Chart.

== Track listing ==
CD1

1. "Suspect Device" (Fingers, Gordon Ogilvie) – 2:29
2. "Wasted Life" (Fingers) – 3:03
3. "Alternative Ulster" (Fingers, Ogilvie) – 2:41
4. "78 RPM" (Fingers, Ogilvie) – 2:36
5. "Gotta Gettaway" (Fingers, Ogilvie) – 3:40
6. "Bloody Sunday" (Fingers, Ogilvie) – 3:29
7. "Straw Dogs" (Fingers, Ogilvie) – 3:20
8. "You Can't Say Crap on the Radio" (Fingers, Ogilvie) – 2:50
9. "At the Edge" (Fingers) – 2:57
10. "Running Bear" (live) (J.P. Richardson, Johnny Preston) – 3:15
11. "White Christmas" (live) (Irving Berlin) – 2:24
12. "Nobody's Hero" (Fingers, Ogilvie) – 4:12
13. "Tin Soldiers" (Fingers, Ogilvie) – 4:49
14. "Back to Front" (Fingers, Ogilvie) – 2:58
15. "Mr. Fire Coal Man" (Wailing Souls) – 4:54

CD2

1. "Just Fade Away" (Fingers, Ogilvie) – 3:03
2. "Go for It" (Fingers) – 3:04
3. "Doesn't Make It Alright" (live) (Dave Goldberg, Jerry Dammers) – 3:26
4. "Silver Lining" (Fingers, Ogilvie) – 3:01
5. "Safe as Houses" (Fingers, Ogilvie) – 5:29
6. "Sad Eyed People" (Fingers, Ogilvie) – 3:53
7. "Two Guitars Clash" (Fingers, Ogilvie) – 4:28
8. "Listen" (Fingers, Ogilvie) – 4:11
9. "That's When Your Blood Bumps" (Fingers, Ogilvie) – 3:41
10. "Good for Nothing" (Fingers, Ogilvie) – 2:44
11. "Talkback" (Fingers, Ogilvie) – 2:47
12. "Stands to Reason" (Fingers, Ogilvie) – 3:01
13. "Bits of Kids" (Fingers, Ogilvie) – 3:35
14. "Touch and Go" (Fingers, Ogilvie) – 3:20
15. "Price of Admission" (Fingers, Ogilvie) – 3:20

== Personnel ==
Stiff Little Fingers

- Jake Burns – Vocals, guitar
- Henry Cluney – Guitar, vocals (lead vocals CD1 tracks 10 & 11, CD2 track 7)
- Ali McMordie – Bass
- Brian Faloon – Drums (CD1 tracks 1–4)
- Jim Reilly – Drums (CD1 tracks 5–15 and CD2 tracks 1–5)
- Dolphin Taylor – Drums, vocals (CD2 tracks 6–15)

== Charts ==
Chart (1983)	Peak position
UK Albums Chart	19
