= No Going Back (Stiff Little Fingers album) =

Studio album by Stiff Little Fingers
- Released: 15 March 2014 (Pledgemusic); 11 August 2014 (general release)
- Recorded: 2007–2014
- Genre: Pop punk
- Length: 45:32
- Label: PledgeMusic, Rigid Digits, Mondo Recordings/INgrooves
- Producer: Stiff Little Fingers

Stiff Little Fingers chronology
| Guitar and Drum (2003) | No Going Back (2014) |

No Going Back is the tenth studio album by punk band Stiff Little Fingers. It was released on 15 March 2014 for a limited time through Pledgemusic, a website where fans can pledge/donate money to purchase the album in various forms. The album was released to the general public on 11 August 2014 through the band's Rigid Digits label and elsewhere through Mondo Recordings/INgrooves. The album is the band's first studio release in eleven years since 2003's Guitar and Drum. It reached No. 1 on BBC Radio 1's UK Top 40 Rock Album Charts on 14 September 2014.

It is the band's first studio album since Now Then... to feature original bassist Ali McMordie, who rejoined the band in 2006.

== Background ==
On 9 March 2007, Jake Burns announced that Stiff Little Fingers would be recording a new album which would hopefully be completed by the end of 2007. They previewed tracks from the new album, "Liar's Club" and "My Dark Places" at live concerts. At the Glasgow Barrowlands gig on 17 March 2011 Burns announced that a new album was being recorded – hopefully for a 2011 release – before launching into a new song, "Full Steam Backwards", about the banking crisis in the UK. Liar's Club is named after a bar in Chicago that Burns drove past on his way home whilst listening to a press report about Tony Blair, George W. Bush and the Iraq War.

On 16 October 2013, the band launched a project on Pledgemusic to raise funds for the new album. The project reached its funding goal within 5 hours. Completion on the album was announced on 25 January 2014 with pre-orders available for its release. Through Pledgemusic, fans are able to buy the album in various different forms such as MP3 download, CD, Deluxe version along with various other items including autographed copies of the album and setlists. Part of the raised money will be donated to a charity project that's very close the band's hearts and ethos. For those who signed up to pledge, the band held an online listening party for the album online on 22 February 2014. The band also held an album release party on its release date at the Queens Hall Nuneaton where the album was played and the band performed some songs from it. The album is also available in MP3 format through other online retailers such as Amazon.com and available on CD at the band's shows. It was released on CD to the general public in August 2014.

== Track listing ==
1. "Liar's Club" – 3:43
2. "My Dark Places" – 4:08
3. "Full Steam Backwards" – 4:19
4. "I Just Care About Me" – 3:16
5. "Don't Mind Me" – 3:11
6. "Guilty As Sin" – 3:50
7. "One Man Island" – 3:46
8. "Throwing It All Away" – 3:25
9. "Good Luck with That" – 2:47
10. "Trail of Tears" – 4:36
11. "Since Yesterday Was Here" – 4:07
12. "When We Were Young" – 4:24

== Personnel ==
- Jake Burns – Vocals, guitar
- Ian McCallum – guitar, Vocals
- Ali McMordie – bass guitar, Vocals
- Steve Grantley – drums, Vocals
