= Go for It (Stiff Little Fingers album) =

Studio album by Stiff Little Fingers
- Released: April 17, 1981
- Recorded: February 9, 1981 – February 22, 1981
- Studios: Jam, Finsbury Park, London
- Genres: Punk rock; new wave
- Length: 38:54
- Label: Chrysalis
- Producer: Doug Bennett

Stiff Little Fingers chronology
Nobody's Heroes (1980)	Go for It (1981)	Now Then... (1982)

Go for It is the third album by Stiff Little Fingers, released in 1981. "Just Fade Away" was released as a single.

== Critical reception ==
Professional ratings
Review scores
Source	Rating
AllMusic	4.5/5 stars
The Encyclopedia of Popular Music	4/5 stars
Sounds	4/5 stars

Trouser Press wrote that Jake Burns's "voice is smoother and less anguished; the music, while no less energetic or committed, is more diverse and sophisticated."

== Track listing ==
All tracks composed by Fingers and Gordon Ogilvie; except where noted.

1. "Roots, Radicals, Rockers and Reggae" (Bunny O'Riley, arranged by Fingers) – 3:59
2. "Just Fade Away" – 3:06
3. "Go for It" (Fingers) – 3:17
4. "The Only One" – 4:18
5. "Hits and Misses" (Jake Burns, Gordon Ogilvie) – 3:51
6. "Kicking Up a Racket" – 2:44
7. "Safe as Houses" – 5:29
8. "Gate 49" – 2:23
9. "Silver Lining" – 3:04
10. "Piccadilly Circus" – 4:43

The following tracks were included on the 2001 EMI re-release:

11. "Mr. Fire Coal Man" (Wailing Souls) – 4:45
12. "Doesn't Make it Alright" (live) (Dave Goldberg, Jerry Dammers, Mike Harrison) – 3:29
13. "Back to Front" – 3.00
14. "Jake Burns Interview with Alan Parker about Go for It" – 25:20

== Chart position ==
Chart (1981)	Peak position
United Kingdom	14

Song	Singles Chart (1981)	Peak position
"Just Fade Away"	United Kingdom	47
"Silver Lining"	United Kingdom	68

== Personnel ==
Stiff Little Fingers

- Jake Burns – vocals, guitar; piano on "Silver Lining"
- Jim Reilly – drums
- Henry Cluney – guitar, backing vocals
- Ali McMordie – bass guitar

with:

- Stewart Blandamer – alto saxophone on "Silver Lining"
- Tony Hughes – trumpet on "Silver Lining"
- Steve "Fixit" Farr – baritone saxophone on "Silver Lining"

Technical

- Doug Bennett – producer, piano on "Silver Lining"
- Bill Gill – engineer
- David Hamilton Smith – engineer
- Shaun Bradley – equipment
- Agency – cow bell
- John "Teflon" Simms – cover illustration
- Eugene Adebari – photography
