= Hanx! =

Live album by Stiff Little Fingers
- Released: 12 September 1980 in the UK
- Recorded: 20 July 1980 at the Rainbow Theatre, London, and 25 July 1980 at Friars, Aylesbury
- Genre: Punk
- Length: 45:25
- Label: Chrysalis
- Producer: Doug Bennett

Stiff Little Fingers chronology
Broken Fingers/Live In Aberdeen (1979)	Hanx! (1980)	Live and Loud (1988)

Professional ratings
Review scores
Source	Rating
Allmusic	link

Hanx! is a live punk album by the band Stiff Little Fingers, released in 1980. Originally intended for the American market, in order to introduce the band before they toured there, it was subsequently released at a budget price in the UK, for the band were concerned that a lot of their fans would insist on buying the album on import anyway for a higher price. Jake Burns remarks on the sleeve notes for the CD reissue that only "Johnny Was" came from the Rainbow Theatre show, with the remainder recorded at the Aylesbury gig.

The title Hanx! is a phonetic representation of Burns' delivery of "Thanks" after most numbers.

== Track listing ==
1. "Nobody's Hero" (Jake Burns, Gordon Ogilvie) – 4:03
2. "Gotta Gettaway" (Fingers, Ogilvie) – 2:23
3. "Wait and See" (Burns, Ogilvie) – 4:19
4. "Barbed Wire Love" (Fingers, Ogilvie) – 3:25
5. "Fly the Flag" (Fingers, Ogilvie) – 3:28
6. "Alternative Ulster" (Fingers, Ogilvie) – 3:01
7. "Johnny Was" (Bob Marley) – 10:09
8. "At the Edge" (Fingers) – 2:38
9. "Wasted Life" (Burns) – 3:28
10. "Tin Soldiers" (Fingers, Ogilvie) – 5:02
11. "Suspect Device" (Fingers, Ogilvie) – 2:17

Some CD reissues have added tracks;these are "Running Bear" and "White Christmas", both B-sides of their "At The Edge" single, plus a further part of a Jake Burns interview with Alan Parker recorded in 2001.

== Charts ==
Chart (1980)	Peak position
UK Albums Chart	9

== Personnel ==
Stiff Little Fingers

- Jake Burns – vocals/guitar
- Jim Reilly – drums
- Henry Cluney – guitar
- Ali McMordie – bass

Technical

- Doug Bennett – producer
- Bill Gill – engineer
- Andi Banks – tour manager
- Arthur Kemish – equipment
- Bazz Ward – Livewire PA
- 'Side' Phil Wilkie – Livewire PA
- Colin Phillipps – Livewire PA
- Alan Espley – light and sound design
- Steve Ruisling – light and sound design
- Mike Carter – road transport
- John Ferguson – security
- Wally Grove – security
- Dave Jupp – Keedwell Trucking
- John Jackson – cowbell agency
- Pete Greenslade – The Manor Mobile
- Dave Chapman – The Manor Mobile
- John "Teflon" Sims – sleeve design
- Dave Storey – sleeve design
- Brian Cooke – front cover pictures and colour effects
- Iain McKell – back cover picture
