= Nobody's Heroes (album) =

Studio album by Stiff Little Fingers
- Released: 7 March 1980
- Recorded: 21 January 1980 – 1 February 1980
- Studios: Olympic Sound Studios, London
- Genre: Punk rock
- Length: 38:06
- Label: Chrysalis
- Producer: Doug Bennett

Stiff Little Fingers chronology
Inflammable Material (1979)	Nobody's Heroes (1980)	Go for It (1981)

Original North American cover

Professional ratings
Review scores
Source	Rating
AllMusic	4.5/5 stars
Billboard	(unrated)
Record Mirror	3/5 stars
Smash Hits	8/10

Nobody's Heroes is the second album by the Northern Irish punk rock band Stiff Little Fingers, released in 1980.

"Doesn't Make It All Right" is a cover of a song from the Specials' debut album, The Specials.

== Track listing ==
All tracks are written by Fingers and Gordon Ogilvie; except where noted.

Side one
No.	Title	Writer(s)	Length
1.	"Gotta Gettaway"		3:37
2.	"Wait and See"		4:28
3.	"Fly the Flag"		3:46
4.	"At the Edge"	Fingers	2:59
5.	"Nobody's Hero"		4:11

Side two
No.	Title	Writer(s)	Length
6.	"Bloody Dub"	Fingers	3:47
7.	"Doesn't Make It All Right"	Dave Goldberg; Jerry Dammers; Mark Harrison	5:50
8.	"I Don't Like You"		2:44
9.	"No Change"		1:56
10.	"Tin Soldiers"		4:46

2001 EMI CD reissue
No.	Title	Length
11.	"Bloody Sunday"	3:24
12.	"Straw Dogs"	3:30
13.	"You Can't Say Crap on the Radio"	2:50

The reissue also includes the second part of an interview of Jake Burns by Alan Parker (the first part is included in the reissue of Inflammable Material).

== Charts ==
Chart (1980)	Peak position
United Kingdom	8

Song	Singles Chart (1979/80)	Peak position
"Straw Dogs"	United Kingdom	44
"At the Edge"	United Kingdom	15
"Nobody's Hero/Tin Soldiers"	United Kingdom	36

== Personnel ==
Stiff Little Fingers

- Jake Burns – vocals, guitar
- Jim Reilly – drums
- Henry Cluney – guitar, backing vocals
- Ali McMordie – bass

Technical

- Doug Bennett – producer
- Laurence Burrage – engineer
- Nigel Brooke-Harte – engineer
- Andi Banks – tour manager
- Shaun Bradley – equipment
- Agency – cowbell
- Geoff Halpin – cover lettering
- Brian Cooke – photography
- Chris Gabrin – photography
- Mats Lundgren – photography
- Barry Plummer – photography
