= Indie music =

Music produced without commercial record labels

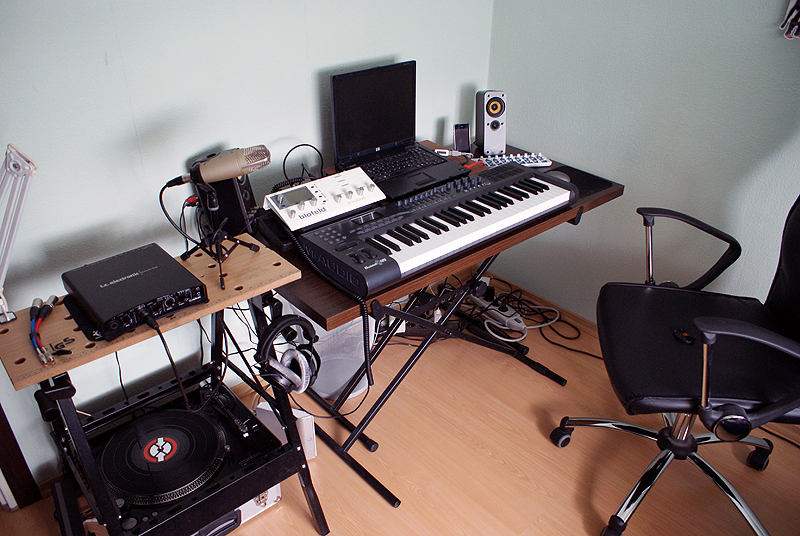
Indie music is known for its DIY, low-budget approach to music

Independent music (also commonly known as indie music, or simply indie) is a broad style of music characterized by creative freedom, low budgets, and a do-it-yourself approach to music creation. It originated from the liberties afforded by independent record labels. Indie music describes a number of related styles, but generally refers to guitar-oriented music that deviates from mainstream conventions. There are a number of subgenres of independent music which combine its characteristics with other genres, such as indie pop, indie rock, indie folk, and indie electronic. Additionally, in certain circles, the term indie has taken on a definition entirely based on the typical sound of independent music in the 1980s, losing its connection to production style.

The origins of independent music lie in the early distribution of private press albums from the 1960s–1970s as well as late '70s British independent record labels, from the early alternative music scene such as Rough Trade, Factory, Industrial Records and Mute, which later contributed to the development of alternative rock music. NME released the influential compilation album C86 in 1986, which helped define indie rock. American independent music first emerged in the 1980s, and was spread via college radios, which led to the term college rock. Styles that evolved out of indie music and reached wide commercial success in the 1990s include grunge (Nirvana, Pearl Jam) and Britpop (Blur, Pulp, and Oasis). In the 21st century, due to the internet, indie music saw a global spread in popularity, as music fans were no longer dependent on physical publications to find new music.

Independent record labels, important to the development of indie music, are characterized by their smaller operations, lower funding, and greater creative control as compared to major labels. Independent labels use a variety of methods of distribution, with the label generally owning the copyright for the sound recording. They generally give smaller advances, or sometimes no advance, and some may offer higher royalty splits than major labels.

== Characteristics ==
Although "indie" was first used to describe music released on independent record labels, the term grew to describe a specific sound because of the creative freedom of its initial bands and artists. A defining characteristic of indie music is that artists retain much more creative control over their music as compared to major labels. Bands often have small budgets, and employ a do-it-yourself ethos which influences their sound. Indie music generally represents guitar-oriented music which strays away from commercial conventions. It often features lyrics that are earnest and emotive, with many cultural and sociopolitical references. Many artists signed to major labels have retained creative control and are still considered indie artists.

== History ==
=== Origins of independent labels ===
Independent labels have a long history of promoting developments in popular music, stretching back to the post-war period in the United States, particularly in genres overlooked by major labels.

During the 1940s–1950s, labels such as King Records, Sun Records, and Stax played a crucial role in the development of jazz, rhythm and blues, and early rock and roll, which were initially sidelined by the majors and were also responsible for pioneering both musical innovation and production techniques that major labels would later emulate, with Atlantic being the first label to make recordings in stereo, while Sun and Chess introduced slapback echo and makeshift echo chambers. Additionally, independent labels were often the only platforms available for marginalized artists in America at the time, which included many Black musicians, as viable mediums to release and distribute their work.

By the 1960s, several British producers and artists launched independent labels as outlets for their work and artists they liked Joe Meek (Triumph Records), Andrew Loog Oldham (Immediate Records), Chris Wright with Terry Ellis (Chrysalis Records) and Larry Page (Page One Records). Independent labels gained further prominence in the American 1960s underground music scene such as ESP-Disk and International Artists. Other independent labels included those in Germany's krautrock scene like Kraftwerk's own label Kling Klang Records as well as Ohr, Brain, and Sky Records.

Prior to the late 1970s, major record companies held so much power that independent labels struggled to establish themselves. During this time, some popular artists formed their own labels, such as the Beatles' Apple Records, Frank Zappa's Straight and Bizarre Records, as well as the Rolling Stones' Rolling Stones Records and Grateful Dead's Grateful Dead Records. However, these ventures often failed commercially or were eventually absorbed by major labels, until the launch of new labels like Virgin Records.

However, this dynamic began to change in 1979 when Rough Trade released the album Inflammable Material by Stiff Little Fingers which went on to be the first independently released album to sell over 100,000 copies. This success sparked major record companies' interest in independent music and by the end of the decade, the establishment of the UK indie charts signaled the growing popularity of the movement. The BBC documentary Do it Yourself: The Story of Rough Trade stated that "when Rough Trade began in 1976 there were about a dozen independent labels in Britain, by the end of the decade there were over 800." Other notable early indie labels include Mute, 4AD, Factory and Creation Records.

=== Emergence as a style ===
During the punk rock era, the number of independent labels grew as they became integral to the early years of punk rock musical distribution, as seen with Beserkley Records in the US, who put out the debut album of the Modern Lovers which was recorded years earlier. In the UK, independent label Stiff Records released the first UK punk single "New Rose" by the Damned. In Australia, Brisbane band the Saints had their first punk release outside the US, "(I'm) Stranded", on their own "Fatal Records" label.

By 1977, Manchester-band Buzzcocks released Spiral Scratch, which alongside the Desperate Bicycles early singles showed listeners how to produce and distribute their own records independently at very low cost, inspiring a wave of DIY punk bands like Swell Maps, 'O' Level, and Television Personalities who helped popularize independent rock releases. Distribution was further improved with the establishment of 'The Cartel', an association of companies like Red Rhino and Rough Trade Records who would take the releases from these small labels and get them into record shops nationwide.

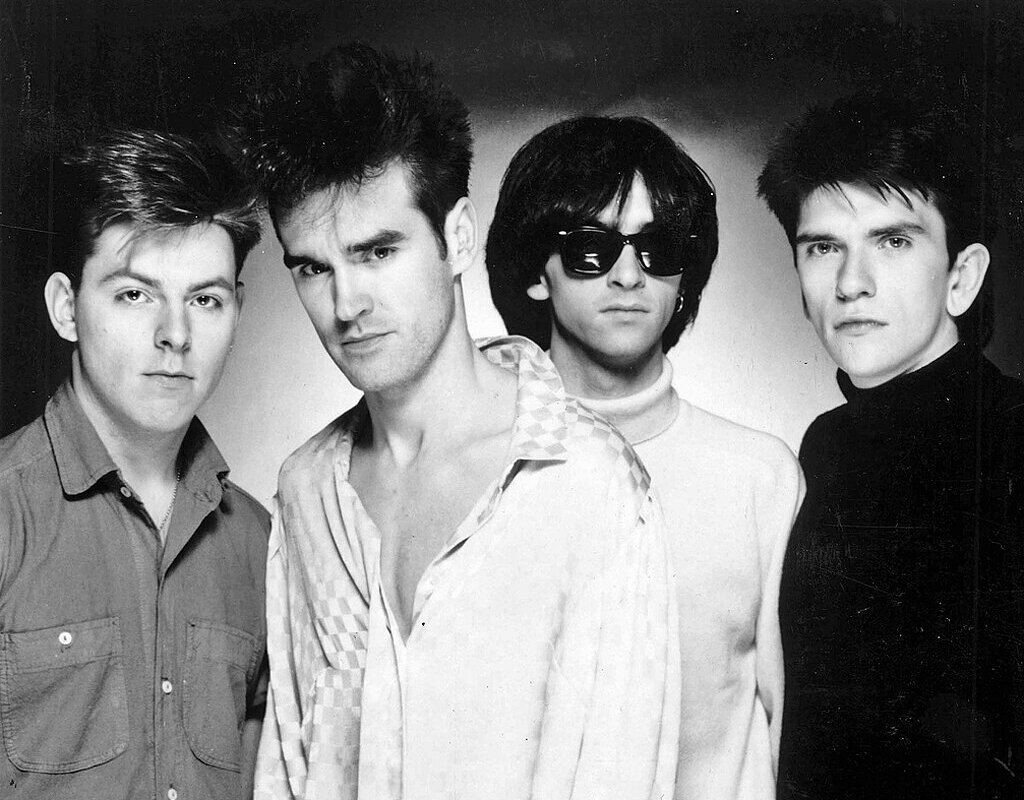
Indie pop band the Smiths in 1985

In the late 1970s, certain UK independent labels (such as Rough Trade, Factory, Fiction, and Mute) contributed to the emergence of a distinct musical style found in indie music, which was influenced by post-punk and new wave. Important albums that contributed to this style include Joy Division's Unknown Pleasures (1979) and Depeche Mode's Speak & Spell (1981). Released on Rough Trade, Inflammable Material (1979) was the first independently released album to sell over 100,000 copies. By the 1980s, the indie pop band the Smiths, signed with Rough Trade, "came to exemplify indie both musically and culturally" according to The Conversation. The Smith's authentic sound contrasted with the common highly produced pop music of the time.

The UK Indie Chart was first compiled in 1980, and independent distribution became better organized from the late 1970s onward. In 1986, NME released the compilation album C86, which was influential to the development of indie music. In the United States, independent music was first spread by in the 1980s by college radios and thus dubbed college rock (also later termed modern rock and alternative rock). Defining American albums of this era include Sonic Youth's Daydream Nation (1988) and Pixies' Doolittle (1989). Indie rock was also heavily promoted by magazines like SPIN throughout the 1980s and 1990s, and books celebrating American indie bands of the era include Our Band Could Be Your Life and Gimme Indie Rock.

Indie music reached wide commercial success in the 1990s, especially with Britpop bands like Blur, Pulp, and Oasis. As well, American grunge bands like Nirvana, Pearl Jam, and the Smashing Pumpkins received mainstream success. In 1991, the Grammys added an Alternative section to its awards ceremony, for "non-traditional form[s]" existing "outside of the mainstream music consciousness".

=== 21st century ===
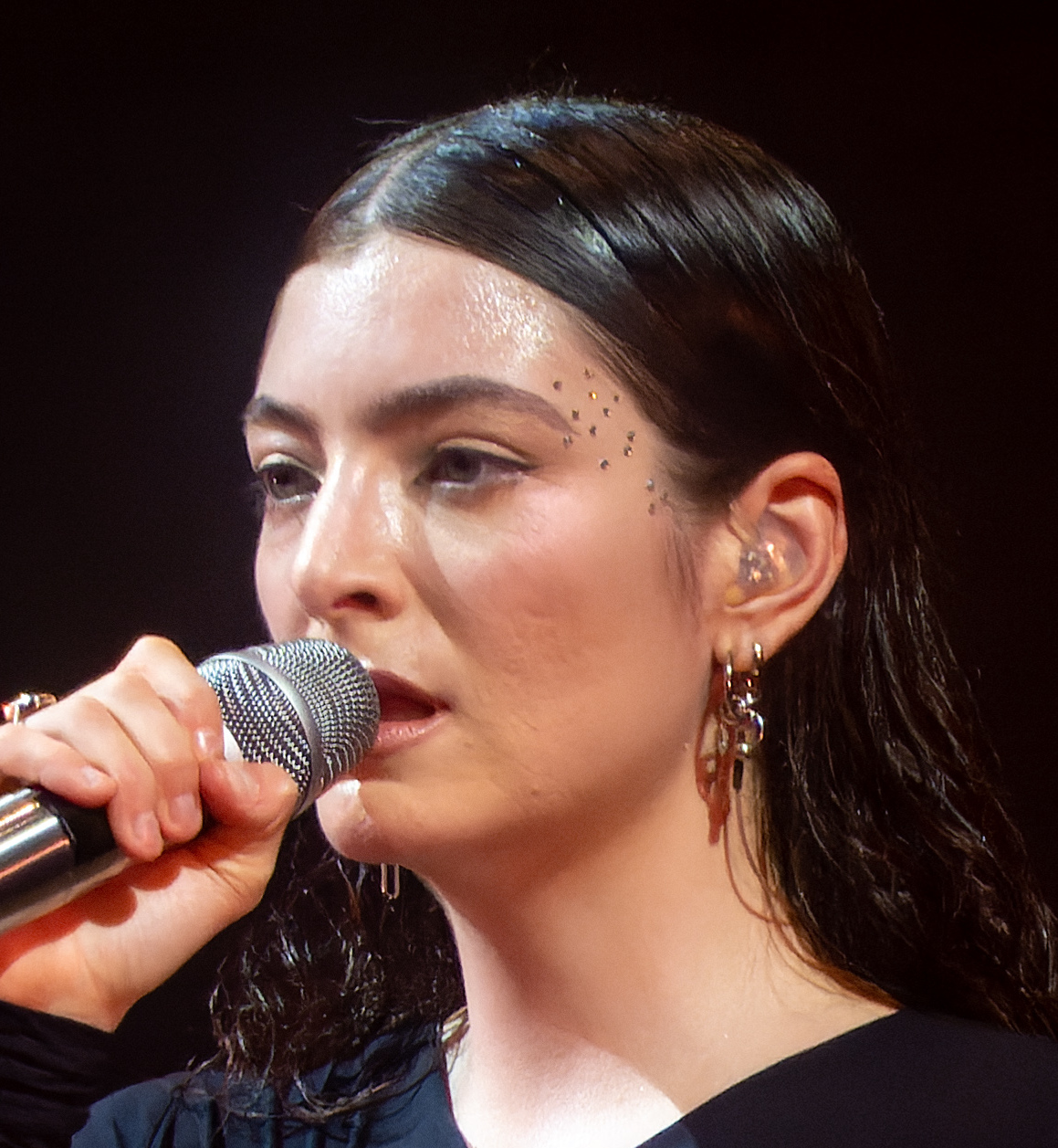
Alt-pop musician Lorde in 2022

The internet's ease of spreading information influenced indie music's popularization in the United States and global spread. Music fans no longer relied on publications or magazines to hear about new artists. At the beginning of the 21st century, the term indie came to describe a number of related but distinct subgenres. One example is indie folk, a stripped-back low fidelity approach to folk music, as seen in Fleet Foxes or Bon Iver's first album, For Emma, Forever Ago. Widely popular indie rock bands of this era include Arcade Fire and Arctic Monkeys. By this time, the term indie had transcended the definition of solely independently released music, and came to represent a "general resistance to popular and mainstream culture, evoking realism, independence and authenticity".

== Independent record labels ==
An independent record label is one that operates outside of the funding and creative control of major record labels. Independent labels generally have greater creative freedom, at the cost of smaller budgets and personnel. They are often able to support artists working in niche styles of music, and rely heavily on personal networking, or word of mouth, to expose their acts. Indie labels are usually small operations, with almost no outside assistance and run out of tiny offices. Some artists choose to go from an independent label to a major label if given the opportunity, as major labels have considerably more power and financial means to promote and distribute products, sometimes increasing the chances of greater success.

=== Distribution ===
There are a few ways an independent label may go about distributing its music. Some independent labels are owned by major labels, who carry out the distribution for them. Other labels instead go through independent distributors. Many current artists use their own resources to produce, record, market and release music through Spotify, SoundCloud, and other streaming platforms with social media in a direct, do-it-yourself manner allowing creative distribution. There is the potential for artists to gain large numbers of streams on Spotify if their music is included in certain popular playlists or has gained traction on social media.

For both independent and major labels, the label generally owns the copyright to the sound recording. Artists who maintain their copyrights usually must sacrifice other parts of their deal, and must give the label a temporary license to the recordings.

=== Contracts ===
An advance is a pre-payment of royalties from the label for the artist to record the album; it is paid back through the album's royalties. Independent labels generally give out much smaller advances than major labels, if any. Additionally, some independent labels will cover an album's recording costs instead of proving a set dollar amount as an advance. One advantage of smaller advances is that artists have less to pay back, and therefore can begin to profit quicker.

There are a number of ways that an independent label may structure their contract. Some independent labels have contracts that are essentially equivalent to major label deals. On a major label, a typical royalty rate (what the artist takes) is 13% to 16%; however, some independent labels offer 50-50 splits, which functions more as a partnership. One issue is that artists often forgo their mechanical royalties in 50-50 deals, and it can be more difficult to recoup the advance, meaning it takes longer to turn a profit. Some labels forgo a formal contract altogether, and their deals include few restrictions.

== Styles ==
Independent music is a broad category that is made up of distinct subgenres with influences from various other genres.

=== Indie pop ===
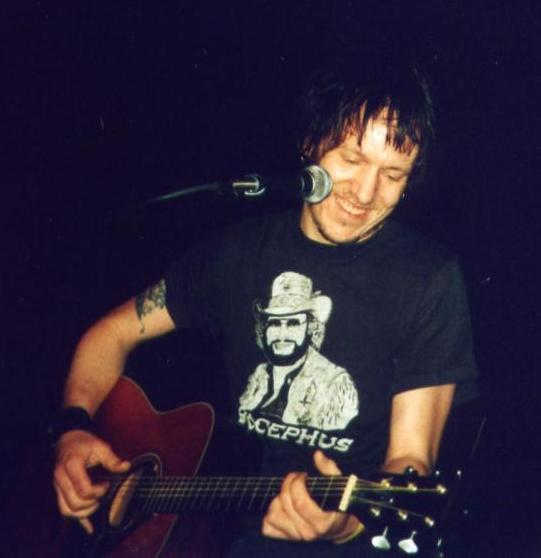
Indie pop musician Elliott Smith

Indie pop is a style of pop music that originally grew out of British post-punk in the late 1970s. Indie pop was one of the first independent music genres, and was initially synonymous with "indie". Indie pop is characterized by a focus on melody, arrangements, and harmony, with less angst and distortion as compared to indie rock. It features the homemade intimacy commonly found in independent music. Notable subgenres include chamber pop, which adds lush chamber orchestration, and twee pop, which features "primitive simplicity".

=== Indie rock ===
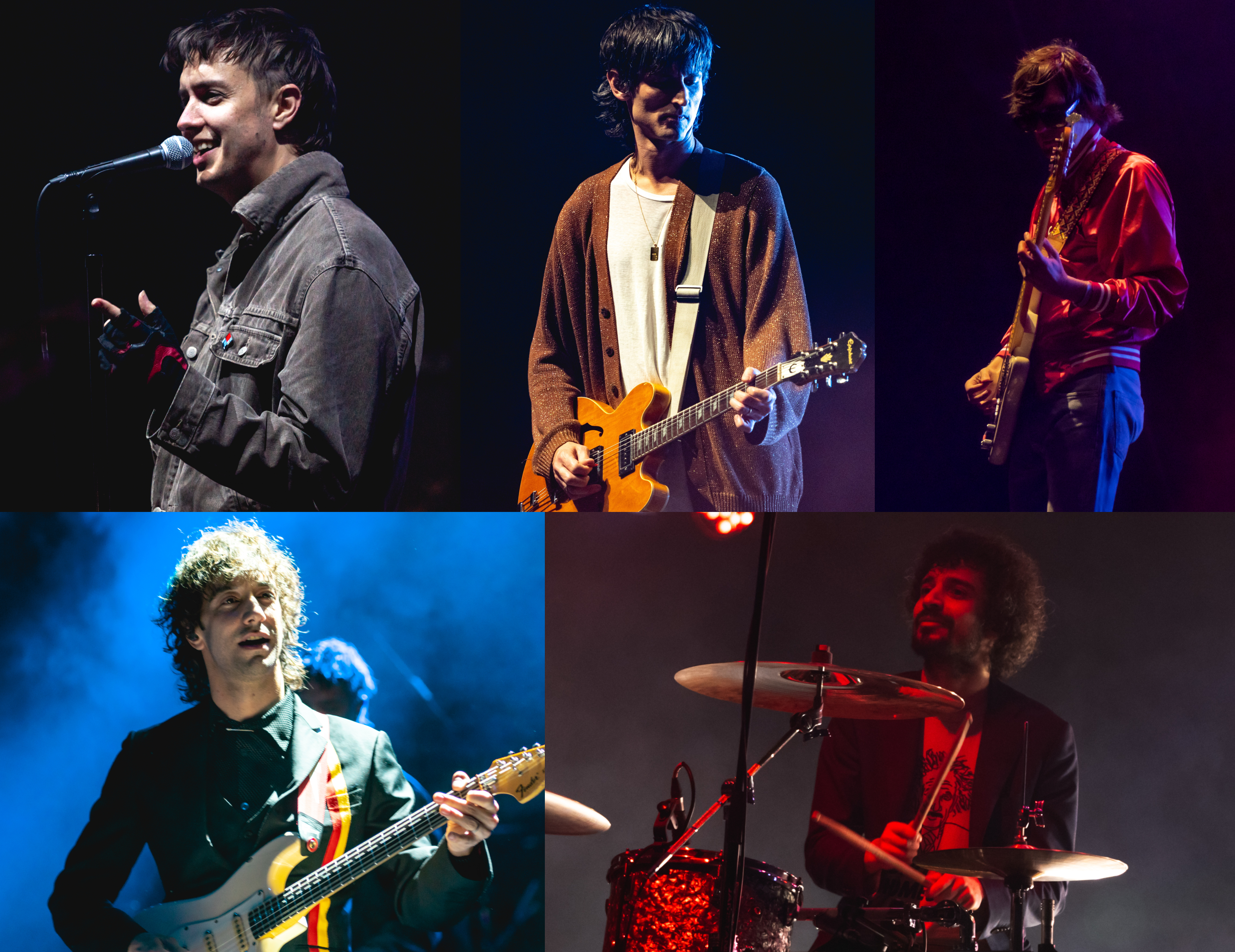
Indie rock band the Strokes

Indie rock (also referred to as simply "indie") is a style of rock music and is one of the most popular independent music genres. It originally grew out of the alternative rock, punk rock, and independent movements of the 1980s, with local scenes emerging in many American cities and college towns. The New Zealand Dunedin sound of the 1970s and 80s was also influential in indie rock's development. By the 1990s, indie rock had separated from alternative rock and gained popularity in the mainstream, pushed along by the popularity of Seattle's grunge scene, especially Nirvana. Notable artists of the 2000s included the Strokes, Yeah Yeah Yeahs, and the Arctic Monkeys, while some of the 2010s included the 1975 and Vampire Weekend. Indie rock went onto inspire a multitude of subgenres and derivative styles, such as dream pop, noise pop, lo-fi, math rock, emo, and more.

=== Indie folk ===
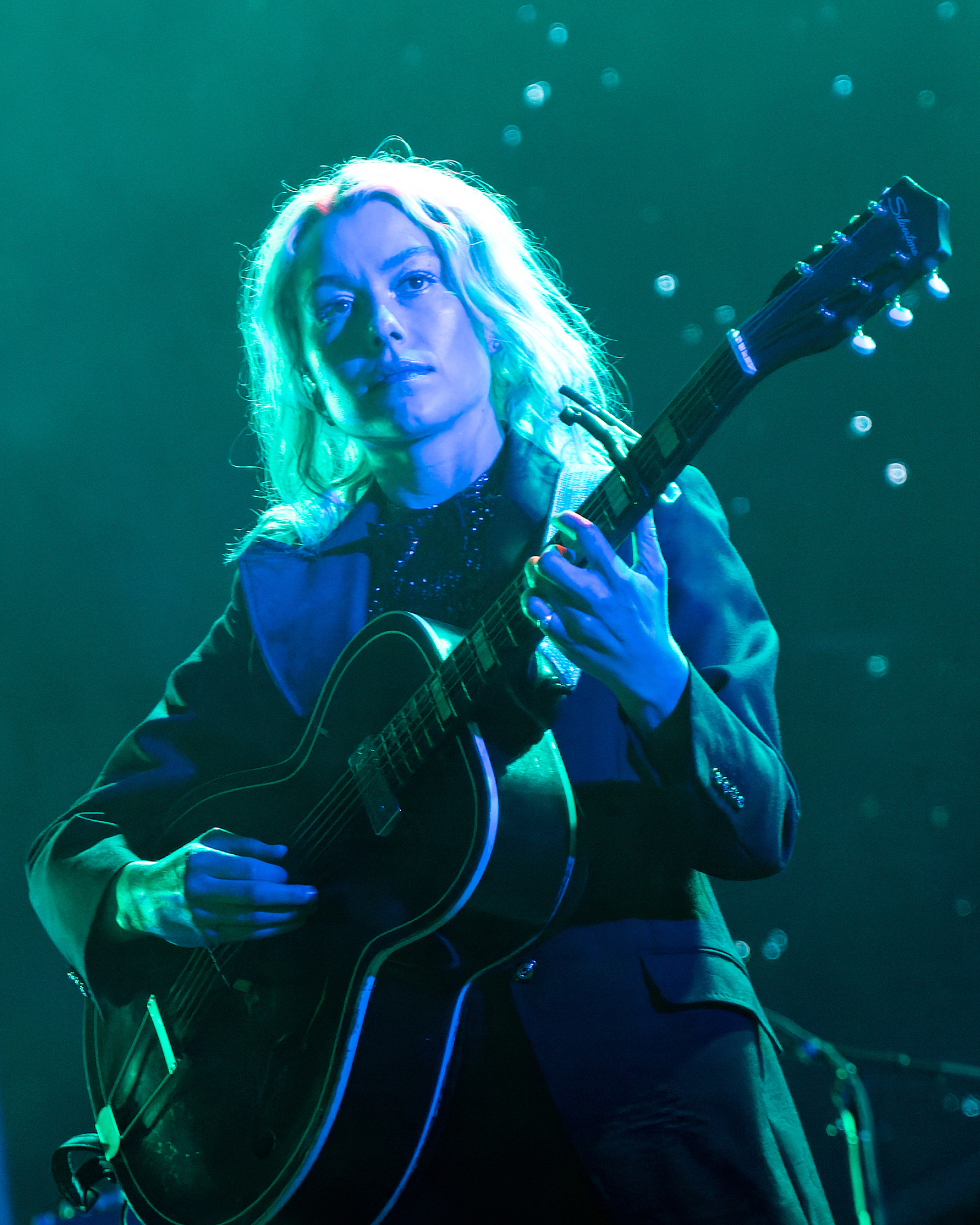
Indie folk musician Phoebe Bridgers

Indie folk is a style of folk music which originated in the 1990s with artists like Elliott Smith and Will Oldham. The genre grew from traditional and contemporary folk, but took a distinctly independent approach inspired by indie rock. The genre gained further popularity and support in the 2000s from labels such as Saddle Creek, Barsuk, and Sub Pop. Notable 21st century indie folk artists include Fleet Foxes, Bon Iver, Great Lake Swimmers, Sufjan Stevens, and Phoebe Bridgers. Indie folk is distinguished by its acoustic instrumentation – and often consists of just vocals and acoustic guitar – although some artists experiment with more diverse instrumentation. As well, indie folk artists are often singer-songwriters.

=== Indie electronic ===
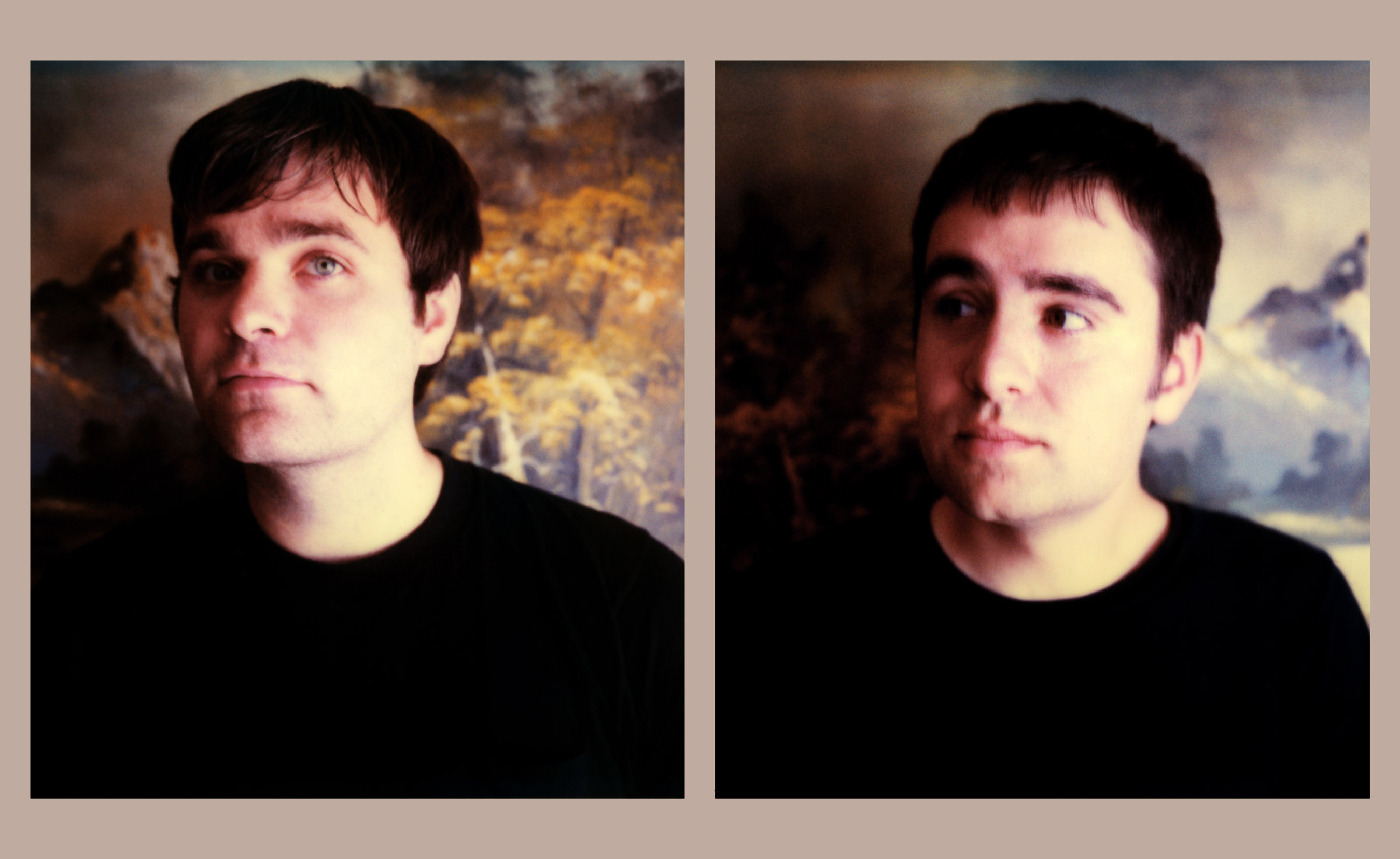
Indie electronic band the Postal Service

Indie electronic, also known as indietronica, is a broad categorization of music that combines independent and electronic music styles. It is not considered a scene or movement, and often combines influences from a variety of genres. It has origins in the 1990s, with artists like Stereolab, Arab Strap, and Disco Inferno contributing to the style. Indietronica largely grew in popularity in the 2000s, with the rising accessibility to home recording and software synthesizers. Influential artists of this era include Hot Chip, Metronomy, and the Postal Service. Some 2010s artists achieved wider success with their music, for example, James Blake and the xx. Indietronica artists usually release their music on independent labels, with examples including Sub Pop, Warp, and Ghostly International.

== See also ==
- Underground music
- Indie music scenes
- Independent record label
- Music industry
- Music recording sales certification
- Lists of record labels
- List of largest music deals
