= Flags and Emblems =

Studio album by Stiff Little Fingers
- Released: 1991
- Recorded: 1991
- Studios: Ezee, London
- Genre: Punk rock
- Length: 36:37
- Label: Castle
- Producer: The Engine Room

Stiff Little Fingers chronology
All the Best (1983)	Flags and Emblems (1991)	Get a Life (1994)

Professional ratings
Review scores
Source	Rating
AllMusic	1.5/5 stars

Flags and Emblems is a studio album by the band Stiff Little Fingers, released in 1991.

== Packaging ==
The album's cover features 21 flags altered to feature the band's logo, as previously seen on the album cover for their first album.

Vietnam	Israel	United Kingdom	Sweden
India	Turkey	Japan	Angola
Switzerland	United Nations		China
Yugoslavia	United Nations		Brazil
Cuba	Ireland	Canada	Germany
France	United States	Australia	USSR

== Track listing ==
All tracks composed by Jake Burns; except where indicated

1. "(It's a) Long Way to Paradise (From Here)"
2. "Stand Up and Shout" (Dolphin Taylor, Burns)
3. "Each Dollar a Bullet"
4. "The 'Cosh' "
5. "Beirut Moon"
6. "The Game of Life"
7. "Human Shield"
8. "Johnny 7" (Henry Cluney)
9. "Die and Burn"
10. "No Surrender"

== Personnel ==
Stiff Little Fingers

- Jake Burns - vocals, guitar
- Dolphin Taylor - drums
- Henry Cluney - guitar
- Bruce Foxton - bass guitar

with:

- Rory Gallagher - slide guitar on "Human Shield"
- Lee Brilleaux - harmonica on "(It's a) Long Way to Paradise (From Here)"
- Jon Snow - announcer voice on "Beirut Moon"

Technical

- Brian Burrows - sleeve design
