= Now Then... =

Studio album by Stiff Little Fingers
- Released: 1982
- Recorded: July 2 – mid-August 1982
- Genres: Rock, punk
- Length: 39:11
- Label: Chrysalis
- Producer: Nick Tauber

Stiff Little Fingers chronology
Go for It (1981)	Now Then... (1982)	All the Best (1983)

Now Then... is the fourth album by the Northern Irish band Stiff Little Fingers, released in 1982. It was produced by Nick Tauber. Some songs employed a horn section. The band broke up after the release of the album.

== Critical reception ==
Professional ratings
Review scores
Source	Rating
AllMusic	2.5/5 stars
The Encyclopedia of Popular Music	2/5 stars

Trouser Press wrote that the album "continues the exploration of more accessible musical turf and is full of solid rock songs that pair energy and melody with clever guitar play."

AllMusic called the album an attempt "to become a full-fledged mainstream rock band," writing that "leader Jake Burns had always professed a high regard for Bruce Springsteen and Little Feat as much as his punk elders, and his lyrics here changed in tone rather than theme."

== Track listing ==
1. "Falling Down" (Fingers, Gordon Ogilvie) – 3:19
2. "Won't Be Told" (Fingers, Ogilvie) – 3:25
3. "Love of the Common People" (John Hurley, Ronnie Wilkins, arranged by Fingers) – 2:39
4. "The Price of Admission" (Fingers, Ogilvie) – 3:22
5. "Touch and Go" (Fingers, Ogilvie) – 3:22
6. "Stands to Reason" (Fingers, Ogilvie) – 3:06
7. "Bits of Kids" (Fingers, Ogilvie) – 3:40
8. "Welcome to the Whole Week" (Fingers, Ogilvie) – 3:45
9. "Big City Night" (Fingers, Ogilvie) – 3:55
10. "Talkback" (Fingers, Ogilvie) – 2:48
11. "Is That What You Fought the War For?" (Fingers, Ogilvie) – 3:55

The following tracks were included on the 2001 EMI re-release:

12. "Good for Nothing" (Fingers, Ogilvie) – 2:44
13. "Listen" – (Fingers, Ogilvie) – 4:14
14. "Sad Eyed People" (Fingers, Ogilvie) – 3:56
15. "That's When Your Blood Bumps" (Fingers, Ogilvie) – 3:44
16. "Two Guitars Clash" (Fingers, Ogilvie) – 4:28
17. "Alan Parker Interviews Jake Burns about "Now Then..."" (Burns/Parker) – 19:40

== Chart position ==
Chart (1982)	Peak position
United Kingdom	24

Song	Singles Chart (1982/83)	Peak position
"Bits of Kids"	United Kingdom	73
"Price of Admission"	United Kingdom	95

== Personnel ==
Stiff Little Fingers

- Jake Burns – vocals, guitar,
- Dolphin Taylor – drums, percussion, vocals,
- Henry Cluney – guitar, vocals
- Ali McMordie – bass guitar

with:

- Dick Morrissey, Jeff Daly, Martin Drover – horns on "Talkback"

Technical

- Tim Friese-Greene – producer on "Talkback"
- Simon Hanhart – engineer
- Brian Cooke – artwork, photography
