= Tinderbox (Stiff Little Fingers album) =

Studio album by Stiff Little Fingers
- Released: 1997
- Genre: Pop punk, alternative rock
- Length: 55:31
- Label: Abstract

Stiff Little Fingers chronology
Get A Life (1994)	Tinderbox (1997)	Hope Street (1999)

Professional ratings
Review scores
Source	Rating
AllMusic	4/5 stars
The Encyclopedia of Popular Music	3/5 stars

Tinderbox is an album by Stiff Little Fingers, released in 1997. Steve Grantley played bass on the album.

== Critical reception ==
The Washington Post called the album "hard-hitting," writing that "there's no way it can recapture the impact of the band's '70s work."

AllMusic wrote that "the biggest surprise is a churning, rubber-burning remake of 'The Message', Grandmaster Flash & the Furious Five's searing indictment of inner-city misery."

== Track listing ==
1. "You Never Hear the One That Hits You" (Burns) – 2:53
2. "(I Could Be) Happy Yesterday" (Burns) – 4:06
3. "Tinderbox" (Burns) – 3:57
4. "Dead of Night" (Burns) – 5:20
5. "The Message" (Grandmaster Flash and the Furious Five) – 3:06
6. "My Ever Changing Moral Stance" (Burns) – 2:48
7. "Hurricane" (Burns) – 4:25
8. "You Can Move Mountains" (Burns, Foxton) – 4:16
9. "A River Flowing" (Burns) – 3:25
10. "You Don't Believe in Me" (Burns) – 3:24
11. "In Your Hands" (Burns) – 4:00
12. "Dust in My Eyes" (Burns, Foxton) – 2:43
13. "Roaring Boys (Part One)" (Burns) – 4:27
14. "Roaring Boys (Part Two)" (Burns) – 6:05

== Personnel ==
Stiff Little Fingers

- Jake Burns - guitar, vocals
- Bruce Foxton - bass; vocals on "Dust in My Eye"
- Steve Grantley - drums, percussion

with:

- Ian McCallum - backing vocals
- Billy Boy Miskimmin - harmonica
- Holly Roberts - keyboards
- Tim Sanders - tenor saxophone
- Simon Clarke - alto and baritone saxophone
- Roddy Lorimer - trumpet
- John Curtis - tin whistle
- Theresa Heanue - fiddle
