= Hope Street (album) =

And Best of All...Hope Street

Studio album by Stiff Little Fingers
- Released: 23 March 1999
- Recorded: 1998
- Genre: Pop-punk, alternative rock
- Length: 48:05
- Label: EMI
- Producer: Karen M. DiGesu

Stiff Little Fingers chronology
Tinderbox (1997)	And Best of All...Hope Street (1999)	Guitar and Drum (2003)

Hope Street...Greatest Hits Live
- Cover of the U.S. version

Professional ratings
Review scores
Source	Rating
AllMusic	3/5 stars

Single disc cover for the UK re-issue of Hope Street

Hope Street is the eighth studio album recorded by Stiff Little Fingers, released in 1999. The album was released as a 2-disc set however each set was different in the UK and U.S. with different track listing order on the Hope Street album and a greatest hits cd for the UK release and live greatest hits for the U.S. release.

== Track listing ==
UK Version
Disc One Hope Street

1. "Hope Street" (Burns) – 3:33
2. "Tantalise" (Burns) – 3:18
3. "What Does It Take" (Burns) – 4:49
4. "Last Train from the Wasteland" – 4:52
5. "All the Rest" (Burns, Grantley) – 3:16
6. "Honeyed Words" (Burns) – 3:34
7. "You Can Get It (If You Really Want It)" – 3:08
8. "Bulletproof" (Burns) – 4:31
9. "Be Seeing You" (Burns, Grantley) – 2:56
10. "Half a Life Away" (Burns, McCallum) – 4:07
11. "No Faith" (Burns) – 3:47
12. "All I Need" (Burns, Grantley) – 5:04

Disc Two And Best of All...

1. Suspect Device
2. Alternative Ulster
3. Barbed Wire Love
4. Johnny Was
5. At the Edge
6. Fly the Flag
7. Tin Soldiers
8. Roots, Radics, Rockers & Reggae
9. Safe As Houses
10. Piccadilly Circus
11. Falling Down
12. Love of the Common People
13. Is that What You Fought the War For?

US Version
Disc One Hope Street

1. "Bulletproof" (Burns) – 4:31
2. "All I Need" (Burns, Grantley) – 5:04
3. "Be Seeing You" (Burns, Grantley) – 2:56
4. "You Can Get It (If You Really Want It)" – 3:08
5. "Half a Life Away" (Burns, McCallum) – 4:07
6. "No Faith" (Burns) – 3:47
7. "Tantalise" (Burns) – 3:18
8. "Hope Street" (Burns) – 3:33
9. "Last Train from the Wasteland" – 4:52
10. "What Does It Take" (Burns) – 4:49
11. "All the Rest" (Burns, Grantley) – 3:16
12. "Honeyed Words" (Burns) – 3:34

Disc Two Greatest Hits Live

1. "Suspect Device [live]" (Ogilvie, Stiff Little Fingers) – 2:30
2. "Alternative Ulster [live]" (Burns, Ogilvie) – 3:19
3. "Johnny Was [live]" (Marley) – 7:44
4. "At the Edge [live]" (Burns) – 3:03
5. "Fly the Flag [live]" (Burns, Ogilvie) – 3:57
6. "Tin Soldiers [live]" (Burns, Ogilvie) – 4:42
7. "Roots, Radicals, Rockers and Reggae [live]" (Stiff Little Fingers) – 3:39
8. "Silver Lining [live]" (Burns, Ogilvie) – 3:22
9. "Wasted Life [live]" (Burns) – 2:58
10. "No Laughing Matter [live]" (Burns) – 3:02

== Personnel ==
- Jake Burns – Vocals, guitar
- Ian McCallum – guitar, Vocals
- Bruce Foxton – bass guitar, Vocals
- Steve Grantley – drums, Vocals
