= Inflammable Material =

Studio album by Stiff Little Fingers
- Released: February 2, 1979
- Recorded: November 1–13, 1978 ("Alternative Ulster" recorded May 1978)
- Studios: Spaceward Studios, Cambridge ("Alternative Ulster" recorded in Island Studios, London)
- Genre: Punk rock
- Length: 41:08
- Label: Rough Trade
- Producers: Geoff Travis; Mayo Thompson; Ed Hollis

Stiff Little Fingers chronology
Inflammable Material (1979)	Nobody's Heroes (1980)

Singles from Inflammable Material
- 1. "Suspect Device" Released: 17 March 1978; 2. "Alternative Ulster" Released: 17 October 1978

Inflammable Material is the debut album by the Northern Irish punk band Stiff Little Fingers released in 1979 by Rough Trade Records. It became the first album on an independent record label to enter the UK Top 20, which led to the wider proliferation of independent labels and later indie rock across the United Kingdom.

At the time, the album was released during the height of The Troubles, most tracks detail the grim reality of life in Northern Ireland in times of polarization and conflict, with songs containing themes of deprivation, sectarian violence and police brutality.

== Background ==
Stiff Little Fingers were formed in 1977, just as the punk movement was rising in the UK. Frontman Jake Burns' previous band, named Highway Star (which also included SLF members Henry Cluney and Brian Faloon), had been a rock covers band. However, as the band discovered punk they reoriented, renaming themselves to Stiff Little Fingers and altering their line-up. In a 2019 interview, Burns said he 'loved the visceral power of [punk]' and the '[Middle] fingers up to the rock establishment aspect.' He was particularly inspired by the Clash 'writing about their lives in a way that really hit home', highlighting their song Career Opportunities as a prime example. Another event which caused SLF to reorient towards punk rock was the 'Battle of Bedford Street', a riot outside of Ulster Hall in October 1977 which erupted due to the cancellation of a Clash performance. In terms of the band realising they were 'not alone' in the Ulster punk scene, the aborted Clash show was 'huge'.

The album was recorded in 1978, mostly at Spaceward Studios in Cambridge, except for 'Alternative Ulster', which was recorded at Island Studios in London. The process was described by Burns as being done 'very quickly' and 'as if we were playing a live gig', due to the band's lack of knowledge in studio recording.

== Reception ==
Professional ratings
Review scores
Source	Rating
AllMusic	4/5 stars
Entertainment Weekly	A−
Q	4/5 stars
Rolling Stone	4/5 stars
The Rolling Stone Album Guide	4/5 stars
Sounds	5/5 stars

On its initial release, Paul Morley of the NME declared that "even more so than Never Mind The Bollocks – which turned out to be comedy – much more so than The Clash – which turned out to be quaint – as astonishing in its impact as The Ramones, Inflammable Material is the classic punk rock record." Morley went on to note the album was a "crushing contemporary commentary, brutally inspired by blatant bitter rebellion and frustration" concluding that "There are parts of Inflammable Material that are not just exciting or stimulating but quite humbling. It is a remarkable document." Garry Bushell of Sounds also praised the album, declaring it "a magnificent slice of vintage punk played fast and frantic, and loaded with powerful lyrics and forceful hooks barked out with anger and conviction by the man with the permanent sore throat, vocalist/lead guitarist Jake Burns." Bushell concluded that "Stiffs to be one of the most impressive old style punk bands to have broken surface in recent times, and my worries are mostly for the future: will their music progress or stagnate?"

== Track listing ==
All tracks composed by Stiff Little Fingers (Jake Burns, Henry Cluney, Ali McMordie, Brian Faloon) and their manager Gordon Ogilvie; except where indicated.

Side one
No.	Title	Writer(s)	Length
1.	"Suspect Device"		2:36
2.	"State of Emergency"	Stiff Little Fingers	2:29
3.	"Here We Are Nowhere"	Stiff Little Fingers	1:00
4.	"Wasted Life"	Stiff Little Fingers	3:10
5.	"No More of That"	Stiff Little Fingers	2:04
6.	"Barbed Wire Love"		3:33
7.	"White Noise"		1:57
8.	"Breakout"	Stiff Little Fingers	3:04
Total length:			19:53

Side two
No.	Title	Writer(s)	Length
1.	"Law and Order"		3:14
2.	"Rough Trade"		2:41
3.	"Johnny Was"	Bob Marley	8:12
4.	"Alternative Ulster"		2:45
5.	"Closed Groove"		4:25
Total length:			21:17

The 2001 EMI CD reissue added the following tracks:

2001 EMI CD reissue
No.	Title	Length
1.	"Suspect Device (single version)"	2:44
2.	"78 RPM"	2:38
3.	"Jake Burns Interview Pt. 1"	17:41
Total length:		23:03

The reissue includes the first part of an interview of Jake Burns by Alan Parker (the second part is included in the reissue of Nobody's Heroes).

== Chart position ==
Chart (1979)	Peak position
United Kingdom	14

This was the first album on an independent record label to enter the UK Top Twenty.

== Personnel ==
Personnel taken from Inflammable Material liner notes.

Stiff Little Fingers

- Jake Burns – lead guitar, vocals
- Henry Cluney – rhythm guitar, vocals ("No More of That")
- Ali McMordie – bass
- Brian Faloon – drums

Technical

- Geoff Travis – producer (except "Alternative Ulster")
- Mayo Thompson – producer (except "Alternative Ulster")
- Mike Kemp – engineer
- Ed Hollis – producer ("Alternative Ulster")
- Doug Bennett – remix ("Alternative Ulster")
