= Guitar and Drum =

Studio album by Stiff Little Fingers
- Released: August 12, 2003
- Recorded: 2003
- Genre: Pop punk
- Length: 48:05
- Label: Kung Fu Records
- Producer: Stiff Little Fingers

Stiff Little Fingers chronology
Hope Street (1999)	Guitar and Drum (2003)	No Going Back (2014)

Professional ratings
Review scores
Source	Rating
AllMusic	4/5 stars

Guitar and Drum is the ninth studio album recorded by Stiff Little Fingers, released in 2003.

== Track listing ==
1. "Guitar & Drum" (Burns) – 3:11
2. "Strummerville" (Burns) – 3:19
3. "Can't Get Away With That" (McCallum) – 3:16
4. "Still Burning" (Burns, Foxton, Grantley) – 3:18
5. "Walkin' Dynamite" (Burns) – 3:51
6. "Dead Man Walking" (Burns) – 3:34
7. "Empty Sky" (Foxton, Grantley) – 2:36
8. "Be True to Yourself" (McCallum) – 3:38
9. "Best of Fools" (Burns) – 2:15
10. "I Waited" (Grantley) – 3:10
11. "Achilles' Heart" (Burns) – 3:04
12. "Who Died and Made You Elvis?" (Burns) – 3:37
13. "High & Low" (Burns) – 2:13
14. "Protect and Serve" (Burns) – 4:03

2009 Deluxe Edition bonus tracks

15. "Tinderbox" (Live) – 4:05
16. "Strummerville" (Live) – 4:19
17. "Can't Get Away with That" (Live) – 3:35
18. "Guitar and Drum" (Live) – 3:19
19. "Bits of Kids" (Live) – 3:56

== Personnel ==
- Jake Burns – Vocals, guitar
- Ian McCallum – guitar, Vocals
- Bruce Foxton – bass guitar, Vocals
- Steve Grantley – drums, Vocals
