= Running Bear =

1959 song by Johnny Preston

- Sleeve of Running Bear by Johnny Preston (1960 UK pressing)

Single by Johnny Preston
- B-side: "My Heart Knows"
- Released: August 1959
- Recorded: May 21, 1959
- Studio: Gold Star (Houston, Texas)
- Genre: Rockabilly; rock and roll
- Length: 2:38
- Label: Mercury
- Songwriter: J. P. Richardson
- Producer: Bill Hall

Johnny Preston singles chronology
"Running Bear" (1959)	"Cradle of Love" (1960)

Official audio
- "Running Bear" on YouTube

"Running Bear" is a teenage tragedy song written by Jiles Perry Richardson (a.k.a. the Big Bopper) and sung most famously by Johnny Preston in 1959. The 1959 recording featured background vocals by George Jones and the session's producer Bill Hall, who provided the "Indian chanting" of "uga-uga" during the three verses, as well as the "Indian war cries" at the start and end of the record. It was No. 1 for three weeks in January 1960 on the Billboard Hot 100 in the United States and the same on Canada's CHUM Charts. The song also reached No. 1 in the UK Singles Chart and New Zealand in 1960. Billboard ranked "Running Bear" as the No. 4 song of 1960. The tenor saxophone was played by Link Davis.

Richardson was a friend of Preston and offered "Running Bear" to him after hearing him perform in a club. Preston recorded the song at the Gold Star Studios in Houston, Texas, a few months after Richardson's death in the plane crash that also killed Buddy Holly and Ritchie Valens. Preston was signed to Mercury Records, and "Running Bear" was released in August 1959.

== Plot ==
The song tells the story of Running Bear, a "young Indian brave", and Little White Dove, an "Indian maid". The two are in love but are separated by two factors:

- Their tribes' hatred of each other: their respective tribes are at war. ("Their tribes fought with each other / So their love could never be.")
- A raging river: a physical separation but also as a metaphor for their cultural separation.

The two, longing to be together, despite the obstacles and the risks posed by the river, dive into the raging river to unite. After sharing a passionate kiss, they are pulled down by the swift current and drown. The lyrics describe their fate: "Now they'll always be together / In their happy hunting ground."

== Chart performance ==
Chart (1959–60)	Peak position
Belgium (Ultratop 50 Flanders)	10
Belgium (Ultratop 50 Wallonia)	22
Canada (CHUM Hit Parade)	1
Netherlands (Single Top 100)	12
Norway (VG-lista)	2
UK Singles (Official Charts)	1
U.S. Billboard Hot 100	1
U.S. Cash Box Top 100	1
West Germany (GfK)	36

== Cover versions ==
A German version titled Brauner Bär und Weiße Taube ("Brown Bear and White Dove") was recorded as a single by Gus Backus in 1960.

In 1960, the Dutch group Het Cocktail Trio recorded a version of the song called Grote Beer ("Great Bear", but also "Ursa Major") about an Indian who travels in space.

Masaaki Hirao recorded a Japanese language version of "Running Bear" in 1960.

George Jones recorded a version on his 1962 album The New Favorites Of George Jones

During the late 1960s and early 1970s, Sonny James enjoyed an unprecedented streak of success with his commercially released singles, many of them covers of previous pop hits. One of his 16 consecutive No. 1 singles on the Billboard Hot Country Singles chart was a cover version of "Running Bear." Released in April 1969, James topped the Hot Country Singles chart in mid-June and spent three weeks at No. 1. The song was one of the most popular recordings of James' career. In Canada, it reached #1 on the country charts and #74 on the rock charts.

Jim Stallings recorded a version of the song on his 1969 album titled Heya!

The Guess Who included the song on their 1972 album Rockin', although the songwriting credit is incorrectly given to Clarence "Curly" Herdman, a country and bluegrass fiddler.

The Youngbloods released a version of the song as a single in 1972 and was featured on their album High on a Ridge Top.

Tom Jones recorded a funk version of the song on his 1973 album The Body and Soul of Tom Jones.

Mud recorded the song on their 1974 debut album Mud Rock which reached #8 in the UK charts.

Danny Davis and the Nashville Brass recorded a toe-tapping version of the song, complete with the standard Nashville Brass banjo-and-steel solo, for their 1975 album Dream Country.

The song was occasionally part of Led Zeppelin's live repertoire in the early 1970s, during rock medleys contained within long versions of "Whole Lotta Love".

The Beach Boys covered the song, along with various other rock and doo-wop standards for their 1976 15 Big Ones album, however the recording of Running Bear didn't make the cut and remained unreleased until the 2026 boxed set We Gotta Groove: The Brother Studio Years.

In 1985 famous New Zealand comedian Billy T James covered Running Bear on his album "live at pips".

In 2012 Ray Stevens covered the song on his 9-CD box set, The Encyclopedia of Recorded Comedy Music.

Northern Irish punk band, Stiff Little Fingers did a live cover of this, which ended up on their album All the Best and later on the re-issue of their live album, Hanx!.

The song is a staple of Williams and Ree's live set and is one of the duo's most popular songs. Ree performs the lead vocals while Williams provides Indian chants and humorous alternatives, such as lyrics from "Pump Up the Jam" and "Ice Ice Baby".

Bob Wills and his Texas Playboys frequently performed the song and it appears on their album Time Changes Everything, and on many greatest hits compilations.
