= Get a Life (Stiff Little Fingers album) =

Studio album by Stiff Little Fingers
- Released: October 18, 1994
- Recorded: 1994
- Studio: Ridge Farm Studio, Surrey
- Genre: Pop punk
- Length: 51:56
- Label: Castle
- Producer: The Engine Room

Stiff Little Fingers chronology
Flags and Emblems (1991)	Get a Life (1994)	Tinderbox (1997)

Professional ratings
Review scores
Source	Rating
Allmusic	3/5 stars

Get a Life is the sixth studio album by Stiff Little Fingers, released in 1994 (see 1994 in music).

== Track listing ==
1. "Get a Life" (Burns) – 5:53
2. "Can't Believe in You" (Burns) – 4:58
3. "The Road to Kingdom Come" (Burns) – 3:27
4. "Walk Away" (Burns) – 5:20
5. "No Laughing Matter" (Burns) – 2:52
6. "Harp" (Burns) – 3:49
7. "Forensic Evidence" (Burns) – 3:39
8. "Baby Blue (What Have They Been Telling You?)" (Burns) – 4:02
9. "I Want You" (Russell Emanuel, Dolphin Taylor) – 4:05
10. "The Night That the Wall Came Down" (Burns) – 3:51
11. "Cold" (Burns) – 4:10
12. "When the Stars Fall from the Sky" (Burns, Foxton) – 3:50
13. "What If I Want More" (Burns) – 1:38

== Personnel ==
Stiff Little Fingers

- Jake Burns - vocals, guitar
- Bruce Foxton - bass, backing vocals
- Dolphin Taylor - drums, backing vocals

Technical

- Jamie Cullum - assistant engineer, assistant
- The Engine Room - mixing
- Karl Trout - artwork, graphic design, art direction, concept design
