= Candidates nominated to run for the 2011 election of the Northern Ireland Assembly =

This is a complete list of candidates nominated to run for the 2011 election of the Northern Ireland Assembly. 14 parties fielded a total of 218 candidates across Northern Ireland's 18, six-member constituencies. Of the 218 candidates fielded, 38 were women.

Constituency	Name	Party
East Antrim	Geraldine Mulvenna	Alliance Party
East Antrim	Stewart Dickson	Alliance Party
East Antrim	Steven Moore	British National Party
East Antrim	Alastair Ross	DUP
East Antrim	David Hilditch	DUP
East Antrim	Gordon Lyons	DUP
East Antrim	Sammy Wilson	DUP
East Antrim	Daniel Donnelly	Green Party
East Antrim	Justin McCamphill	SDLP
East Antrim	Oliver McMullan	Sinn Féin
East Antrim	Ruth Wilson	TUV
East Antrim	Rodney McCune	UUP
East Antrim	Roy Beggs	UUP
East Belfast	Chris Lyttle	Alliance Party
East Belfast	Judith Cochrane	Alliance Party
East Belfast	Ann Cooper	British National Party
East Belfast	Peter Robinson	DUP
East Belfast	Robin Newton	DUP
East Belfast	Sammy Douglas	DUP
East Belfast	Martin Gregg	Green Party
East Belfast	Dawn Purvis	Independent
East Belfast	Stephen Stewart	Independent
East Belfast	Brian Ervine	PUP
East Belfast	Magdalena Wolska	SDLP
East Belfast	Niall Ó Donnghaile	Sinn Féin
East Belfast	Tommy Black	Socialist Party
East Belfast	Harry Toan	TUV
East Belfast	Michael Copeland	UUP
East Belfast	Philip Robinson	UUP
East Belfast	Kevin McNally	Workers Party
East Londonderry	Barney Fitzpatrick	Alliance Party
East Londonderry	Adrian McQuillan	DUP
East Londonderry	Gregory Campbell	DUP
East Londonderry	George Robinson	DUP
East Londonderry	David McClarty	Independent
East Londonderry	John Dallat	SDLP
East Londonderry	Thomas Conway	SDLP
East Londonderry	Bernadette Archibald	Sinn Féin
East Londonderry	Cathal Ó hOisin	Sinn Féin
East Londonderry	Boyd Douglas	TUV
East Londonderry	David Harding	UUP
East Londonderry	Lesley Macauley	UUP
Fermanagh and South Tyrone	Hannah Su	Alliance Party
Fermanagh and South Tyrone	Arlene Foster	DUP
Fermanagh and South Tyrone	Maurice Morrow	DUP
Fermanagh and South Tyrone	Pat Cox	Independent
Fermanagh and South Tyrone	Michelle Gildernew	SDLP
Fermanagh and South Tyrone	Tommy Gallagher	SDLP
Fermanagh and South Tyrone	Phil Flanagan	Sinn Féin
Fermanagh and South Tyrone	Sean Lynch	Sinn Féin
Fermanagh and South Tyrone	Alex Elliott	TUV
Fermanagh and South Tyrone	Kenny Donaldson	UUP
Fermanagh and South Tyrone	Tom Elliott	UUP
Foyle	Keith McGrellis	Alliance Party
Foyle	William Hay	DUP
Foyle	Paul McFadden	Independent
Foyle	Terry Doherty	Independent
Foyle	Eamonn McCann	People Before Profit Alliance
Foyle	Colum Eastwood	SDLP
Foyle	Mark H Durkan	SDLP
Foyle	Pól Callaghan	SDLP
Foyle	Pat Ramsey	SDLP
Foyle	Martina Anderson	Sinn Féin
Foyle	Paul Fleming	Sinn Féin
Foyle	Raymond McCartney	Sinn Féin
Lagan Valley	Trevor Lunn	Alliance Party
Lagan Valley	Brenda Hale	DUP
Lagan Valley	Edwin Poots	DUP
Lagan Valley	Jonathan Craig	DUP
Lagan Valley	Paul Givan	DUP
Lagan Valley	Conor Quinn	Green Party
Lagan Valley	Pat Catney	SDLP
Lagan Valley	Mary-Kate Quinn	Sinn Féin
Lagan Valley	Lyle Rea	TUV
Lagan Valley	Basil McCrea	UUP
Lagan Valley	Mark Hill	UUP
Mid-Ulster	Michael McDonald	Alliance Party
Mid-Ulster	Ian McCrea	DUP
Mid-Ulster	Gary McCann	Independent
Mid-Ulster	Hugh McCloy	Independent
Mid-Ulster	Harry Hutchinson	People Before Profit Alliance
Mid-Ulster	Austin Kelly	SDLP
Mid-Ulster	Patsy McGlone	SDLP
Mid-Ulster	Francie Molloy	Sinn Féin
Mid-Ulster	Ian Milne	Sinn Féin
Mid-Ulster	Martin McGuinness	Sinn Féin
Mid-Ulster	Michelle O'Neill	Sinn Féin
Mid-Ulster	Walter Millar	TUV
Mid-Ulster	Sandra Overend	UUP
Newry and Armagh	David Murphy	Alliance Party
Newry and Armagh	William Irwin	DUP
Newry and Armagh	James Malone	Independent
Newry and Armagh	Dominic Bradley	SDLP
Newry and Armagh	Thomas O\'Hanlon	SDLP
Newry and Armagh	Cathal Boylan	Sinn Féin
Newry and Armagh	Conor Murphy	Sinn Féin
Newry and Armagh	Mickey Brady	Sinn Féin
Newry and Armagh	Barrie Halliday	TUV
Newry and Armagh	Robert Woods	UKIP
Newry and Armagh	Danny Kennedy	UUP
North Antrim	Jayne Dunlop	Alliance Party
North Antrim	David McIlveen	DUP
North Antrim	Evelyne Robinson	DUP
North Antrim	Mervyn Storey	DUP
North Antrim	Paul Frew	DUP
North Antrim	Declan O\'Loan	SDLP
North Antrim	Daithi McKay	Sinn Féin
North Antrim	Audrey Patterson	TUV
North Antrim	Jim Allister	TUV
North Antrim	Bill Kennedy	UUP
North Antrim	Robin Swann	UUP
North Belfast	Billy Webb	Alliance Party
North Belfast	Nelson McCausland	DUP
North Belfast	Paula Bradley	DUP
North Belfast	William Humphrey	DUP
North Belfast	Raymond McCord	Independent
North Belfast	Alban Maginness	SDLP
North Belfast	Caral Ni Chuilin	Sinn Sinn Féin
North Belfast	Gerry Kelly	Sinn Féin
North Belfast	JJ Magee	Sinn Féin
North Belfast	Fred Cobain	UUP
North Belfast	John Lavery	Workers Party
North Down	Stephen Farry	Alliance Party
North Down	Anne Wilson	Alliance Party
North Down	Alex Easton	DUP
North Down	Gordon Dunne	DUP
North Down	Peter Weir	DUP
North Down	Steven Agnew	Green Party
North Down	Alan Chambers	Independent
North Down	Alan McFarland	Independent
North Down	Liam Logan	SDLP
North Down	Conor Keenan	Sinn Féin
North Down	Fred McGlade	UKIP
North Down	Colin Breen	UUP
North Down	Leslie Cree	UUP
South Antrim	David Ford	Alliance Party
South Antrim	Stephen Parkes	British National Party
South Antrim	Pam Lewis	DUP
South Antrim	Paul Girvan	DUP
South Antrim	Trevor Clarke	DUP
South Antrim	Thomas Burns	SDLP
South Antrim	Mitchel McLaughlin	Sinn Féin
South Antrim	Mel Lucas	TUV
South Antrim	Adrian Cochrane-Wilson	UUP
South Antrim	Danny Kinahan	UUP
South Belfast	Anna Lo	Alliance Party
South Belfast	Jimmy Spratt	DUP
South Belfast	Ruth Patterson	DUP
South Belfast	Clare Bailey	Green Party
South Belfast	Brian Faloon	People Before Profit Alliance
South Belfast	Samuel Smyth	Procapitalism
South Belfast	Alasdair McDonnell	SDLP
South Belfast	Conall McDevitt	SDLP
South Belfast	Alex Maskey	Sinn Féin
South Belfast	Paddy Meehan	Socialist Party
South Belfast	Nico Torregrosa	UKIP
South Belfast	Mark Finlay	UUP
South Belfast	Michael McGimpsey	UUP
South Belfast	Paddy Lynn	Workers Party
South Down	David Griffin	Alliance Party
South Down	Jim Wells	DUP
South Down	Cadogan Enright	Green Party
South Down	Eamonn O\'Neill	SDLP
South Down	Karen McKevitt	SDLP
South Down	Margaret Ritchie	SDLP
South Down	Caitriona Ruane	Sinn Féin
South Down	Naomi Bailie	Sinn Féin
South Down	Willie Clarke	Sinn Féin
South Down	Henry Reilly	UKIP
South Down	John McCallister	UUP
Strangford	Kieran McCarthy	Alliance Party
Strangford	Billy Walker	DUP
Strangford	Jonathan Bell	DUP
Strangford	Michelle McIlveen	DUP
Strangford	Simon Hamilton	DUP
Strangford	Joe Boyle	SDLP
Strangford	Mickey Coogan	Sinn Féin
Strangford	Terry Williams	TUV
Strangford	Cecil Andrews	UKIP
Strangford	David McNarry	UUP
Strangford	Mike Nesbitt	UUP
Upper Bann	Harry Hamilton	Alliance Party
Upper Bann	Sheila McQuaid	Alliance Party
Upper Bann	Stephen Moutray	DUP
Upper Bann	Sydney Anderson	DUP
Upper Bann	Dolores Kelly	SDLP
Upper Bann	John O\'Dowd	Sinn Féin
Upper Bann	Johnny McGibbon	Sinn Féin
Upper Bann	David Vance	TUV
Upper Bann	Barbara Trotter	UKIP
Upper Bann	Colin McCusker	UUP
Upper Bann	Joanne Dobson	UUP
Upper Bann	Sam Gardiner	UUP
West Belfast	Dan McGuinness	Alliance Party
West Belfast	Brian Kingston	DUP
West Belfast	Brian Pelan	Independent
West Belfast	Gerry Carroll	People Before Profit Alliance
West Belfast	Alex Attwood	SDLP
West Belfast	Colin Keenan	SDLP
West Belfast	Fra McCann	Sinn Féin
West Belfast	Jennifer McCann	Sinn Féin
West Belfast	Paul Maskey	Sinn Féin
West Belfast	Sue Ramsey	Sinn Féin
West Belfast	Pat Sheehan	Sinn Féin
West Belfast	Pat Lawlor	Socialist Party
West Belfast	Bill Manwaring	UUP
West Belfast	John Lowry	Workers Party
West Tyrone	Eric Bullick	Alliance Party
West Tyrone	Allan Bresland	DUP
West Tyrone	Thomas Buchanan	DUP
West Tyrone	Eugene McMenamin	Independent
West Tyrone	Paddy McGowan	Independent
West Tyrone	Joe Byrne	SDLP
West Tyrone	Barry McElduff	Sinn Féin
West Tyrone	Declan McAleer	Sinn Féin
West Tyrone	Michaela Boyle	Sinn Féin
West Tyrone	Pat Doherty	Sinn Féin
West Tyrone	Ross Hussey	UUP
