= Jake Burns and the Big Wheel =

Jake Burns and the Big Wheel were a band put together by former Stiff Little Fingers vocalist Jake Burns in 1983. The band consisted of Burns, Steve Grantley on drums, Sean Martin on bass guitar, and Pete Saunders on keyboards. They split up in 1987 when Burns rejoined Stiff Little Fingers.

The band's debut single, "She Grew Up", originally released in 1984, reached No. 36 on the UK Independent Singles Chart in 1986. The band signed to Jive Records, and their final single, "Breathless", reached number 99 on the UK Singles Chart. The band recorded two sessions for BBC Radio 1; a December 1983 session for David Jensen's show was broadcast in January 1984, and a May 1986 session was broadcast on Janice Long's show the following month. Their 1987 performance at the Golders Green Hippodrome was broadcast on BBC Radio 1's In Concert in June 1987.

In 2002, an album collecting the band's released material, as well as tracks recorded for BBC radio sessions, previously unreleased studio recordings and live tracks, titled On Fortune Street, was released.

== Discography ==
=== Albums ===
- On Fortune Street (2002), EMI

=== Singles ===
- "She Grew Up" b/w "Race You to the Grave" (1984)
- "On Fortune Street" b/w "Here Comes That Song Again" (1985)
- "Breathless" b/w "Valentine's Day" (1987)
