= Dolphin Taylor =

British drummer (born 1958)

Dolph Taylor
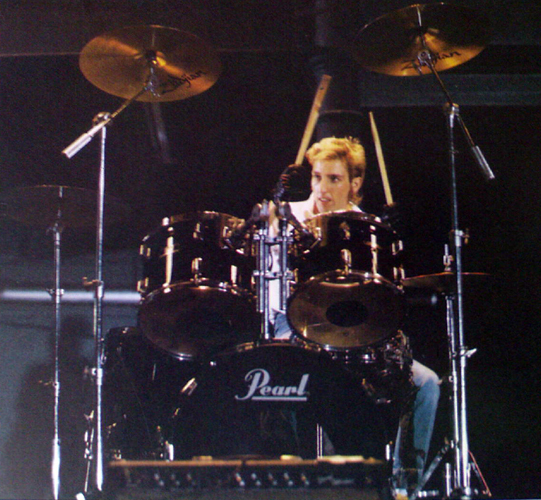
- Taylor performing in 1985

Background information
- Born: Brian Taylor; 10 November 1958 (age 67)
- Origin: Cowley, Middlesex, England
- Genres: Rock, punk rock
- Occupation: Drummer

Brian "Dolph" Taylor (born 10 November 1958) is a British former drummer.

== Career ==
=== Tom Robinson Band ===
Taylor's first band was Dragon's Playground, which earlier had had Annie Lennox as a vocalist. In 1976 Dragon's Playground appeared on ATV's New Faces.

His career with the Tom Robinson Band started when Taylor gave a friend a lift to an audition as bass guitarist for the Tom Robinson Band in 1976. As the band had no drummer at that point, Taylor (who was already a drummer) filled in. By the end of the evening, the band was still looking for a bass guitarist, but had found their drummer. He stayed for two years, eventually resigning in 1978.

=== Stiff Little Fingers ===
In 1982 he joined Stiff Little Fingers, playing on the £1.10 or less EP, and the Now Then... (1982) album, before the band split in 1983.

=== Spear of Destiny ===
In 1983 after the demise of SLF, Taylor become the occasional session drummer for producer Nick Tauber. Towards the end of 1983 through his work with Nick Tauber, he was introduced to and joined Kirk Brandon's Spear of Destiny as their full-time drummer. Dolph became a part of The Engine Room, the Spear of Destiny rhythm section, along with bass player Stan Stammers. He left Spear of Destiny in 1986 after they were dropped by their record label CBS, and after the band went through a line-up change.

=== Marius Müller-Westernhagen ===
Taylor also was working with a German artist for quite some time in the late 70's and early 80's, singer-songwriter Marius Müller-Westernhagen, appearing on the latter's 1983 album 'Geiler Is' Schon', as an example.

=== Stiff Little Fingers ===
In 1987 Taylor was asked to join the reformed SLF, with whom he stayed until 1996, playing on 1991's Flags and Emblems and 1994's Get a Life.

=== Post-SLF ===
In 1997 he and one time SLF manager Russell Emanuel set up Extreme Music, a company that composes and sells production music.

| Preceded by Jim Reilly | Drummer for Stiff Little Fingers; 1981–1982 | Succeeded by Group Disbanded |
| Preceded by group inactive | Drummer for Stiff Little Fingers; 1987–1996 | Succeeded by Steve Grantley |
