= Jim Reilly =

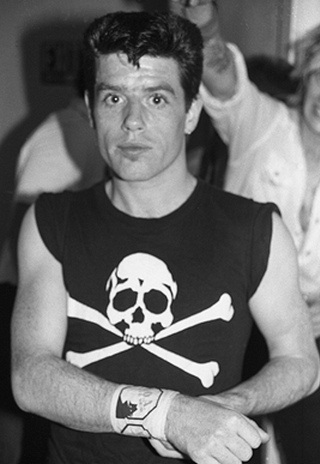
- Jim Reilly

Background information
- Born: James G. Reilly; 9 May 1957 (age 68); Belfast, Northern Ireland
- Origin: Boston, Massachusetts, United States
- Genres: Rock, punk rock
- Instrument: Drums
- Formerly of: Stiff Little Fingers, Red Rockers, The Raindogs, Little Fingers, Jim Reilly's Alternative Soldiers, XSLF

James G. Reilly (born 9 May 1957) is the second drummer for the Northern Ireland based punk band Stiff Little Fingers, with whom he played from 1979 to 1981. He played on the LPs Nobody's Heroes, Go for It and Hanx. In 1981, he moved to the United States, where he played in two bands, Red Rockers, followed by The Raindogs. In the late 1980s, he lived in Boston and worked as a band manager. He has since moved back to Northern Ireland. For a time in 2004, he played in SLF tribute band Little Fingers, and later led Jim Reilly's Alternative Soldiers, after which he played in a new band called The Dead Handsomes. In July 2013, he and Henry Cluney, also formerly of Stiff Little Fingers, began playing live together under the name XSLF in a 3-piece with Ave Tsarion.

| Preceded by Brian Faloon | Drummer for Stiff Little Fingers; 1979–1981 | Succeeded by Dolphin Taylor |
