= Ian McCallum (guitarist) =

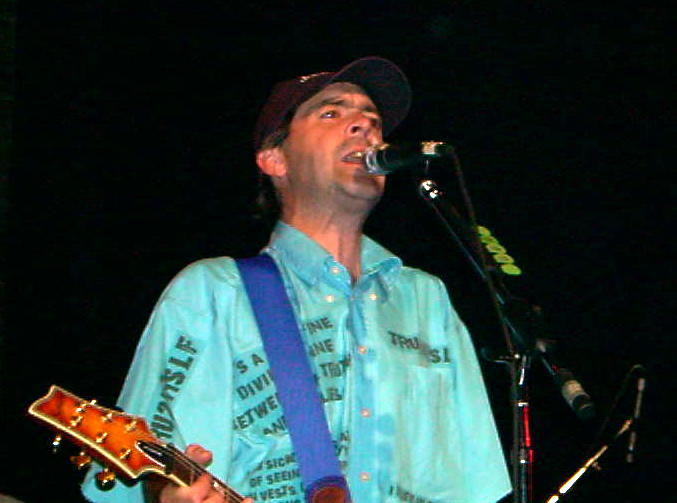
- Ian McCallum in 2004

Background information
- Born: September 1965 (age 60); Gosforth, Newcastle upon Tyne, England, United Kingdom
- Genres: Rock, punk rock
- Occupations: Guitarist, songwriter
- Instrument: Guitar

Ian McCallum (born September 1965) is an English guitarist and songwriter.

== Early life ==
He was born in Gosforth, Newcastle upon Tyne, England, and supports Scottish football club Rangers.

He's also a lifelong fan of Newcastle United football club.

== Career ==
McCallum started writing and touring in the early 1980s. He plays guitar for Stiff Little Fingers, and is also a recording artist in his own right.

He is a fan of the English folk-rock band Lindisfarne, and played guitar for them on one occasion when Simon Cowe was unavailable. He also co-wrote, with Lindisfarne member Alan Hull, the band's single "We Can Make It". Additionally, McCallum's album Take Me as I Am (1997) features a cover of the Lindisfarne song "Heroes" (from their album Dance Your Life Away (1986)) and a tribute to Hull – "Song for Alan".

== Discography ==
=== As McCallum ===
- Left Handed (1988)
- Big Bigg Market (1992)
- Take Me As I Am (1997)

=== With Stiff Little Fingers ===
- Hope Street (1999)
- Guitar and Drum (2004)
- No Going Back (2014)

== See also ==
- List of people from Newcastle upon Tyne
- List of guitarists
- List of songwriters

Preceded by Henry Cluney	Guitarist for Stiff Little Fingers (alternating with Dave Sharp); 1993–1994	Succeeded by incumbent
Preceded by Dave Sharp/Ian McCallum	Guitarist for Stiff Little Fingers; Since 1994	Succeeded by incumbent
