= Brian Faloon =

- Born: Brian Faloon; 27 May 1958 (age 68)
- Origin: Belfast, Northern Ireland
- Genres: Rock, punk rock
- Instrument: drums

Brian Faloon is a musician born in Belfast, Northern Ireland. He played drums for Highway Star, who were to become Stiff Little Fingers, having met two of the other band members at Belfast Boys' Model School. Faloon stayed with SLF long enough to record their first album Inflammable Material but decided the rock 'n' roll lifestyle wasn't for him, so left the band, inspiring the words to SLF's single "Wait and See". In the nineties, Faloon occasionally performed as a guest drummer with the SLF tribute band Hanx who went on to become minor Punk band 'The Red Eyes'.

As of 2009, he is back in Northern Ireland where he presents a weekly show on local radio. In 2011 he ran as a candidate for the "People Before Profit" party in Belfast South.

Preceded by 1st incumbent	Drummer for Stiff Little Fingers; 1977–1979	Succeeded by Jim Reilly
