= Steve Grantley =

English rock drummer

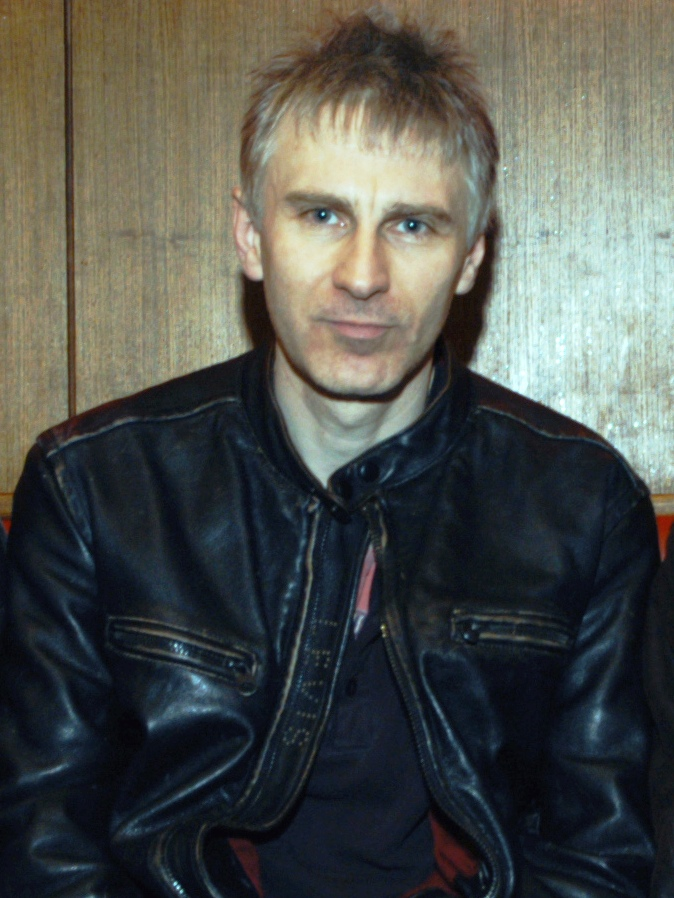
- Grantley in 2006

Background information
- Born: 8 March 1962 (age 64)
- Origin: England
- Genres: Rock; punk rock
- Occupations: Drummer; author
- Instrument: Drums
- Member of: Stiff Little Fingers
- Formerly of: Eighth Wonder; The Alarm; Jake Burns and the Big Wheel

Steve Grantley (born 8 March 1962) is an English rock drummer who plays for Stiff Little Fingers, and formerly the Alarm and RTZ Global. Between 1982 and 1987, he played drums for Jake Burns and the Big Wheel. He has also worked with Alicia Keys, Julian Lennon and the band Eighth Wonder and auditioned for the Clash after the departure of Terry Chimes.

He has written two books with Alan Parker, one about the 1970s rock band Slade and another about the Who called Who by Numbers.

== Bibliography ==
- The Who by Numbers, Steve Grantley, Alan Parker, Helter Skelter Publishing, 24 June 2010, ISBN 978-1905139262
- Cum On, Feel the Noize : The Story of Slade, Steve Grantley, Alan Parker, Carlton Books, 4 September 2006, ISBN 978-1844421510

Preceded by Dolphin Taylor	Drummer for Stiff Little Fingers; 1997–present	Succeeded by incumbent
