= Henry Cluney =

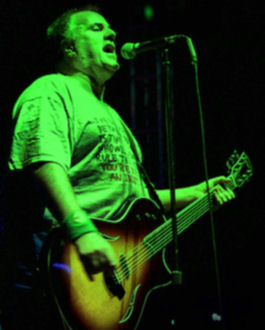

Background information
- Born: Henry William Cluney; 4 August 1957 (age 69); Belfast, Northern Ireland
- Origin: Rochester, Minnesota, United States
- Genres: Rock, punk rock
- Instrument: Guitar

Henry Cluney (born 4 August 1957) is an Irish punk rock guitarist and former member of the band Stiff Little Fingers. He remained with the group until lead singer Jake Burns disbanded them in 1983.

He toured briefly with the band Dark Lady supporting Jake Burns and the Big Wheel, notably at the Marquee Club in Wardour Street but then spent five years back in Belfast teaching guitar until Stiff Little Fingers was reformed. He was a regular songwriting contributor for the group's first four albums, taking over lead vocal duties on his own compositions. He left the group amid some acrimony in 1993.

He moved to Rochester, Minnesota in 1997, keeping up his involvement in music, playing guitar with several regional rock bands.

Cluney completed a feature-length film in 2008/9 and, in 2009, toured the UK for the first time in fifteen years, as the opening for The Damned and The Alarm on their 341 tour. He subsequently toured the next two years, as a solo artist, and in 2013 formed XSLF with former bandmate Jim Reilly, and friend, Ave Tsarion. In December 2024, as Unpopular Mechanics, Cluney and bandmate Craig Hilmer, of A Wretched Excess, released an instrumental album on Bandcamp. Foscrite is a six song set of loose, psychedelic, drone, and punk influenced soundscapes.

He lives in Rochester with his wife, Carol, while touring frequently throughout the United Kingdom (including Northern Ireland), Ireland and Europe with his nephew David Cluney who also plays the guitar.

Preceded by 1st incumbent	Guitarist for Stiff Little Fingers; 1977–1982	Succeeded by group disbanded
Preceded by group inactive	Guitarist for Stiff Little Fingers; 1987–1993	Succeeded by Dave Sharp/ Ian McCallum
