= Alan G. Parker =

British documentary film director

Alan G. Parker is a British documentary film director best known for his films Who Killed Nancy?, Monty Python: Almost the Truth - The Lawyers Cut and It Was Fifty Years Ago Today! The Beatles: Sgt. Pepper & Beyond. He has also written several books about rock musicians and their lives.

== Early life and career ==
Parker was born in Lancashire, England. As a child, he was diagnosed with macrocephaly.

Prior to becoming a filmmaker, Parker worked as a press officer via Judy Totton Publicity and later in the catalogue department of EMI Records in London. At EMI, Parker worked with various punk and rock bands such as Buzzcocks, The Stranglers and Stiff Little Fingers. During that time, he also wrote for magazines and published books about Sid Vicious, the Clash and Stiff Little Fingers.

In 2009 Parker directed Who Killed Nancy? and Monty Python: Almost The Truth - The Lawyers Cut, which was nominated for six Emmy awards. Parker also directed the documentary It Was Fifty Years Ago Today! The Beatles: Sgt. Pepper & Beyond, released in 2017.

== Films ==
- Who Killed Nancy? (2009)
- Love Kills – The Story of Sid and the Pistols (2007) (documentary included in a 2007 DVD reissue of Sid and Nancy)
- Monty Python – Almost the Truth (Lawyers Cut) (2009)
- The David Essex Story
- Hello Quo (about Status Quo) (2012)
- Rebel Truce – The History of the Clash (2007)
- Never Mind the Sex Pistols (2005)
- The Making of All Mod Cons (contributor) (2006)
- It Was Fifty Years Ago Today! The Beatles: Sgt. Pepper & Beyond (2017)
- Borrowed Time: Lennon's Last Decade (2025)

== Books ==
- The Who by Numbers: The Story of the Who Through Their Music (2009): ISBN 1900924919
- Sid Vicious: No One Is Innocent (2007): ISBN 0752875469
- Cum On, Feel the Noize: The Story of Slade (2006): ISBN 1844421511
- Vicious: Too Fast to Live (2004): ISBN 1840681101
- Stiff Little Fingers: Song by Song (2003): ISBN 186074513X
- The Clash: Rat Patrol from Fort Bragg (2003):ISBN 0953572498
- John Lennon & the FBI Files (2003): ISBN 1860745229
- Satellite: Sex Pistols (1999): ISBN 0953572439
- Sid’s Way: Sid Vicious (1991): ISBN 071192483X
