= Stiff Little Fingers =

Northern Irish punk rock band

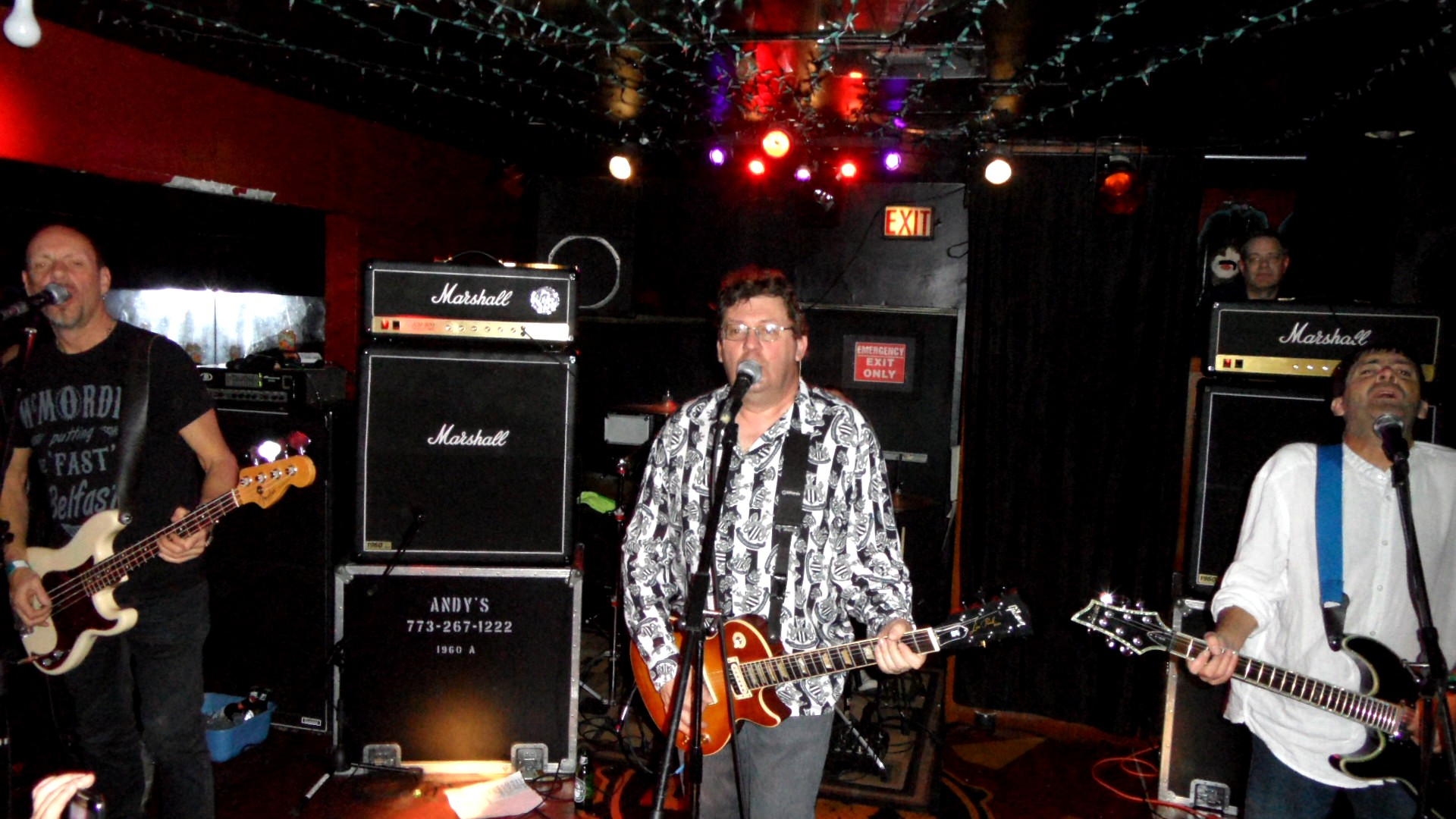
- Live in Chicago 2012; From left to right: Ali McMordie, Jake Burns, Ian McCallum

Background information
- Origin: Belfast, Northern Ireland
- Genre: Punk rock
- Years active: 1977–1982; 1987–present
- Labels: Rigid Digits; Pledgemusic; Rough Trade; Chrysalis; Kung Fu; EMI; Mondo Recordings/INgrooves
- Members: Jake Burns; Ali McMordie; Steve Grantley; Ian McCallum
- Past members: Henry Cluney; Dave Sharp; Gordon Blair; Brian Faloon; Jim Reilly; Dolphin Taylor; Bruce Foxton
- Website: www.slf.rocks

Stiff Little Fingers is a Northern Irish punk rock band from Belfast. They formed in 1977 at the height of the Troubles, which informed much of their songwriting. They started out as a schoolboy band called Highway Star (named after the Deep Purple song), doing rock covers, until they discovered punk. They were the first punk band in Belfast to release a record – the "Suspect Device" single came out on their own independent label, Rigid Digits. Their album Inflammable Material, released in partnership with Rough Trade, became the first independent LP to enter the UK top 20.

In 1983 they split up, but re-formed a few years later in 1987. Despite multiple personnel changes, they are still touring and recording. In 2014, the band released their tenth studio album and a world tour followed its release. Jake Burns, the lead singer, is the only member to have been with the band during all its incarnations, but in March 2006, original bass guitarist Ali McMordie rejoined them following the departure of bass player Bruce Foxton after fifteen years.

== History ==
=== Early years ===
Prior to becoming Stiff Little Fingers, Jake Burns, vocals and guitar, Henry Cluney, guitar, Gordon Blair, bass, and Brian Faloon, drums, were playing in a rock music cover band, Highway Star, in Belfast. Upon the departure of Blair (who went on to play with another Belfast group, Rudi), Ali McMordie took over on bass. Cluney had by this time discovered punk, and introduced the rest of the band to it. They decided that Highway Star was not a punk enough name, and after a brief flirtation with the name "The Fast", decided to call themselves Stiff Little Fingers, after The Vibrators' song, which appears on the album Pure Mania.

Stiff Little Fingers, especially the frontman and main songwriter Jake Burns, were heavily influenced by The Clash and Elvis Costello. According to Burns, "what [The Clash] did more than anything else was give me the confidence, through its lyrical subject matter, to realise it was OK to write about my own life and experiences." The group started to write songs about growing up in the Troubles in late 1970s Northern Ireland. Among the first Stiff Little Fingers songs were "State of Emergency" and "Breakout".

It was while doing a gig at the Glenmachan Hotel, Belfast, that they first met Gordon Ogilvie, who had been invited along for the evening by Colin McClelland, a journalist whom Burns had been corresponding with.

==== "Suspect Device" ====
Ogilvie further encouraged SLF to play material based upon their experience of the Troubles. He asked the group to look at some lyrics he had drafted. They liked the lyrics and "Suspect Device" became a fixture in their live set. Around the same time as putting a tune to the "Suspect Device" lyrics, Burns wrote "Wasted Life".

McClelland arranged to get the band some recording time at a local radio station, and in the studio normally used for recording jingles, they recorded "Suspect Device". The single was packaged in the form of a cassette, with a cover depicting a cassette incendiary bomb, apparently causing great hilarity in the group, when one record company phoned them and asked for another copy, as they had thrown the first one in a bucket of water for fear that it was a real bomb.

"Suspect Device" was released in February 1978. A copy of the single was sent to John Peel. He played it repeatedly leading to a distribution deal through Rough Trade Records. The single was released on the band's own Rigid Digits label, re-released a month later with the support of Rough Trade and sold over 30,000 copies.

Live footage of SLF performing "Suspect Device" at Belfast's Pound Club on 17 January 1978 – the first time the group played the song live – appeared as part of an Ulster TV Revue programme 'It Makes You Want to Spit' about punk in Belfast. The programme was broadcast on 6 March 1978.

SLF's decision to write songs about the experiences of young people growing up in The Troubles proved controversial. Some Northern Ireland punk bands felt songs about the Troubles were exploiting the sectarian conflict. There was also criticism and suspicion over the involvement and influence the management team, especially Gordon Ogilivie, was having on the band. The political differences were reinforced by musical differences as SLF's rockier punk sound contrasted with the more melodic pop punk of The Undertones and Rudi. Some of the criticism was simply down to band rivalries and jealousy.

There were a number of well-publicised arguments; The Undertones accused Stiff Little Fingers of sensationalising the Northern Ireland conflict, while they retorted that The Undertones ignored it. Michael Bradley, The Undertones bassist, tells of a confrontation in 1979 between The Undertones’ John O’Neill and SLF's Jake Burns: "He launched into Jake, not physically but verbally. Slagging his records, slagging the journalist writing the songs and slagging the band." Michael Bradley now describes ‘Suspect Device’ as "a great record, although at the time we weren't impressed, probably because they'd made a record before us".

Terri Hooley, of Northern Ireland's Good Vibrations records, also says that "SLF were really starting to make waves beyond Northern Ireland, and I always see them as the ones that got away. I know I have always said I never rated them, but that was probably jealousy on my part. I actually think they are a great band and deserve their success".

SLF built up a big following among young people in Belfast: "As a 14 or 15-year-old schoolboy back in the late Seventies, I wasn't at all concerned with who had written (or contributed to) the lyrics of their songs. To me, it was crystal clear that the band meant what they were singing and even better, they were singing about my life and offering me alternative points of view. Their initial burst of raw energy on the Ulster Punk scene was captivating and as soon as they transferred that energy to vinyl they were truly off and running." (Sean O’Neill, co-author of It Makes You Want To Spit - The Definitive Guide to Punk in N.Ireland)

==== Alternative Ulster ====
John Peel arranged for the group to record a session for his Radio One show. The songs broadcast on 13 April 1978 were "Wasted Life", "Johnny Was", "Alternative Ulster" and "State of Emergency". Another John Peel session was recorded in September – "Law And Order", "Barbed Wire Love", "Suspect Device" and a new longer version of "Johnny Was" were broadcast on 18 September 1978.

In the second half of 1978, SLF toured as the support band to the Tom Robinson Band.

Their second single, "Alternative Ulster", was released on Rough Trade in October 1978. It was originally intended to be given away free with the fanzine of the same name. SLF performing "Alternative Ulster" at a gig in Belfast at the end of October 1978 can be seen in Shellshock Rock, an independent documentary on punk in Northern Ireland, released in 1979.

By the end of 1978, SLF's growing popularity was reflected in "Suspect Device" reaching No. 4 and "Alternative Ulster" being voted No. 11 in the annual Festive Fifty broadcast on the John Peel show.

==== Inflammable Material ====
In February 1979, SLF released their first album on the Rough Trade label, Inflammable Material. The band had signed a contract with Island Records, but it fell through, leaving the group to release the album on Rough Trade, their existing label. Despite the album's independent release, it reached number 14 in the UK Albums Chart and reached Silver status, selling over 100,000 copies. Inflammable Material was the first album distributed by Rough Trade, and the first independent album to chart in the UK.

The Inflammable Material album was heavily influenced by the band's experience of growing up in Belfast during the Troubles. However, of the 13 tracks, only 6 were directly about Northern Ireland and the political situation - "Suspect Device", "State of Emergency", "Wasted Life", "No More Of That", "Barbed Wire Love", and "Alternative Ulster". Even "Alternative Ulster", which has references to "You got the Army on the street, and the RUC dog of repression is barking at your feet", is mainly about being a bored teenager in the late 1970s. Another track on the album, "Johnny Was" is a cover of a Bob Marley and the Wailers song with the words adapted to place the song in Belfast.

"Everybody refers to it as "the Irish record" but I always say to go and look at the tracks and there's probably 4 out of 13 that refer specifically to Northern Ireland. The rest of it is ... just disaffected teenagers kicking against the world". (Jake Burns, SLF)

The album received critical acclaim in the music press. Paul Morley, in a contemporary review for NME, stated that "Inflammable Material is the classic punk rock record. A crushing contemporary commentary, brutally inspired by blatant bitter rebellion and frustration". Morley would go on to state that "Stiff Little Fingers are the best rock'n'roll band in my world... By the end of 1978 [they] were the most popular new group in Britain."

==== Gotta Gettaway ====
The new interest in the band inspired their move to London, which led to the departure of Brian Faloon and Colin McClelland (who along with Gordon Ogilvie had been joint manager of the band up until that point). Jim Reilly became their drummer in time for the "Gotta Gettaway" single, and played in the Rock Against Racism tour.

To coincide with the release of "Gotta Gettaway", SLF headlined their first tour with 21 dates across Britain and Ireland. The highlight of the tour was the gig at Belfast's Ulster Hall on 21 May 1979. For anyone doubting SLF's popularity in Northern Ireland, this was the first time a local punk band had headlined what was at the time the biggest music venue in Belfast. The group were welcomed home with a sell-out crowd.

"Of all the shows, one of the best, without doubt, was the first time we headlined Belfast's Ulster Hall, on the ‘Gotta Gettaway’ tour. At the height of the Troubles we packed the place and then some, and staring out at that seething mass of young people just enjoying themselves and having a great time to the music, was something that has remained a treasured memory for me all these years. That night I realised we were doing something that none of the politicians were able to do. In that hall, in the midst of a city gripped by sectarian violence, killing and hatred, we brought together the people of our hometown, regardless of religion". (Jim Reilly, Stiff Little Fingers drummer)

==== Nobody's Heroes and Go for It ====
In mid-1979, Stiff Little Fingers signed their Rigid Digits label to Chrysalis Records, and in 1980 released their second album, Nobody's Heroes.

The Nobody's Heroes era brought some success in media terms, with the single "Straw Dogs" narrowly missing the cut for Top of the Pops; they eventually got on the show twice, with "At the Edge" and "Nobody's Hero". However, after their appearance with "At The Edge" the band were told they would never be invited on again as they did not take it seriously as they were not playing live; it was to be one of the most infamous Top of the Pops''s performances. They subsequently appeared on Top of the Pops for "Nobody's Hero", "Just Fade Away" and "Listen".

In 1981 the band released their third studio album Go for It which was to be Jim Reilly's last involvement with the band. Go for It signified the change in Burns' writing style, with much darker and taboo subjects, such as domestic abuse in the song "Hits and Misses" and football hooliganism in the song "Back to Front" (not on the original LP but a bonus track on CD reissue) but the band also still told the story of being a teenager growing up with the song "Kicking Up a Racket".

=== Breakup ===
==== Now Then... ====
In 1982 came a 4-song EP called £1.10 or Less and their fourth studio album, Now Then... (actually their fifth album, as they had released a live LP, Hanx, as their official third album between Nobody's Heroes and Go for It). Now Then was the first album for former Tom Robinson band's drummer Dolphin Taylor. In the face of low sales and concert attendances, they broke up in 1983, when Burns said: "Our last LP Now Then was to my mind the best album we have made. But it is also unfortunately the best I think we will ever make. So I have decided to call it a day". The band later revealed the original split had been somewhat acrimonious, with band members apparently having fistfights rather than talking through their differences. Burns stated in a 1989 interview that they "couldn't stand the sight of each other".

=== Reformation ===
After Burns had moved on from Stiff Little Fingers, he had a short stint at a band with former The Jam bassist Bruce Foxton. They made a couple of demos, but Foxton received an invitation to make a solo album which ended their collaboration.

In 1987 the band reformed. Despite some critics who had said "Nobody would be interested in coming to see you" the band had a successful tour including Germany with shows selling out night after night. The band changed their plan of it just being a temporary re-union and decided it was to be permanent.

==== Flags and Emblems ====
Ali McMordie decided he could not commit the time to tour full-time or record and so left, being replaced by Bruce Foxton in time to record 1991's Flags and Emblems. In Britain, the single from this album, "Beirut Moon", was withdrawn from sale on the first day of release, allegedly because it criticised the government for not acting to free hostage John McCarthy, who had been held in Lebanon.

In 1993, Henry Cluney was asked to leave the band, and the trio of Jake Burns, Bruce Foxton and Dolphin Taylor continued for the next four years, joined on live shows by either Dave Sharp or Ian McCallum.

==== Get a Life ====
In 1994, they released Get a Life in the UK, releasing it in the US in 1996. By the end of 1996 Taylor left due to family commitments. Burns called in Steve Grantley who had played drums for Jake Burns and the Big Wheel in the late 1980s.

==== Tinderbox Hope Street and Guitar and Drum ====
The trio of Burns, Foxton and Grantley recorded 1997's Tinderbox album, with help from Ian McCallum who joined as a full-time member for 1999's Hope Street. This same line-up recorded 2003's Guitar and Drum.

=== Lineup change ===
On 18 January 2006, Foxton left the band.

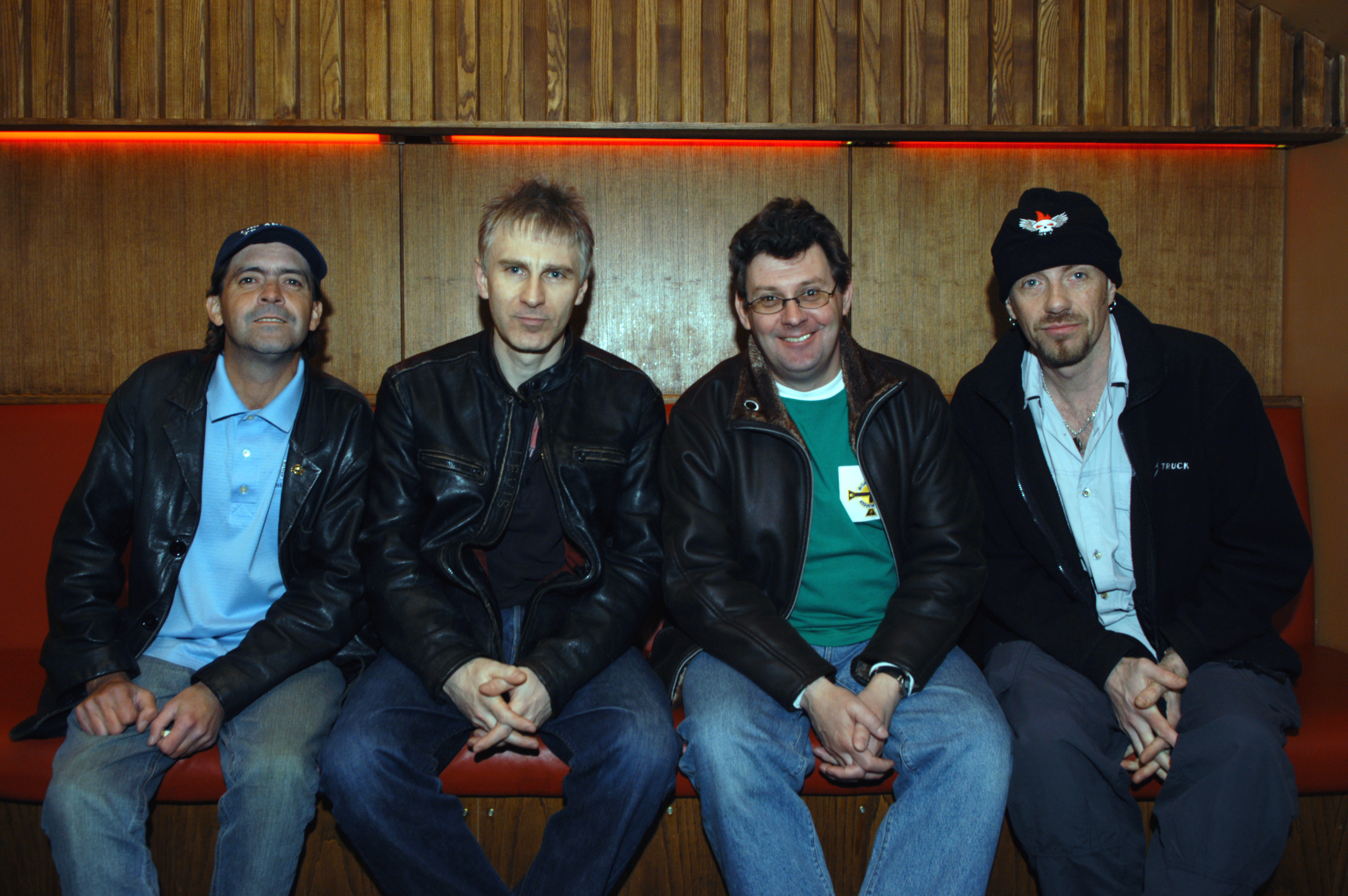
Current lineup. Left to right: guitarist Ian McCallum, drummer Steve Grantley, frontman Jake Burns, and bassist Ali McMordie.

On 23 January 2006, it was announced that original bass guitarist Ali McMordie was to rejoin the band for the duration of their upcoming March tour. The tour was a success, with many fans writing into SLF's message board saying how much they enjoyed it, and how fired up the band seemed to be. After much discussion regarding the status of McMordie within the band after the tour, on 21 April 2006, Burns posted on the message board "For the time being Mr. McMordie is happy to continue as long as his busy schedule allows. It may be that occasionally we have to bring on a "substitute", if he is up to his eyes and we need to do something, but hopefully we can avoid that." Mr. McMordie has occasionally been unable to tour due to other commitments and on those occasions, his place has been taken by Mark DeRosa of Chicago band, Dummy.

On 25 May 2006, SLF announced Ian McCallum would not be able to join the band on its Spring US tour due to health reasons. John Haggerty of Pegboy and Naked Raygun fame would fill in on guitar. McCallum has since rejoined the band and has toured with them ever since.

==== No Going Back ====
On 9 March 2007, Burns announced that Stiff Little Fingers would record a new album, to be released later that year. A new song, "Liars Club", was added to their set lists that year. The track was named after a bar Burns drove past while listening to a press report about Tony Blair, George W. Bush and the Iraq War. At the Glasgow Barrowlands gig on 17 March 2011 Burns announced that the new album was being recorded – hopefully for a 2011 release – before launching into a new song, "Full Steam Backwards", about the banking crisis in the UK.

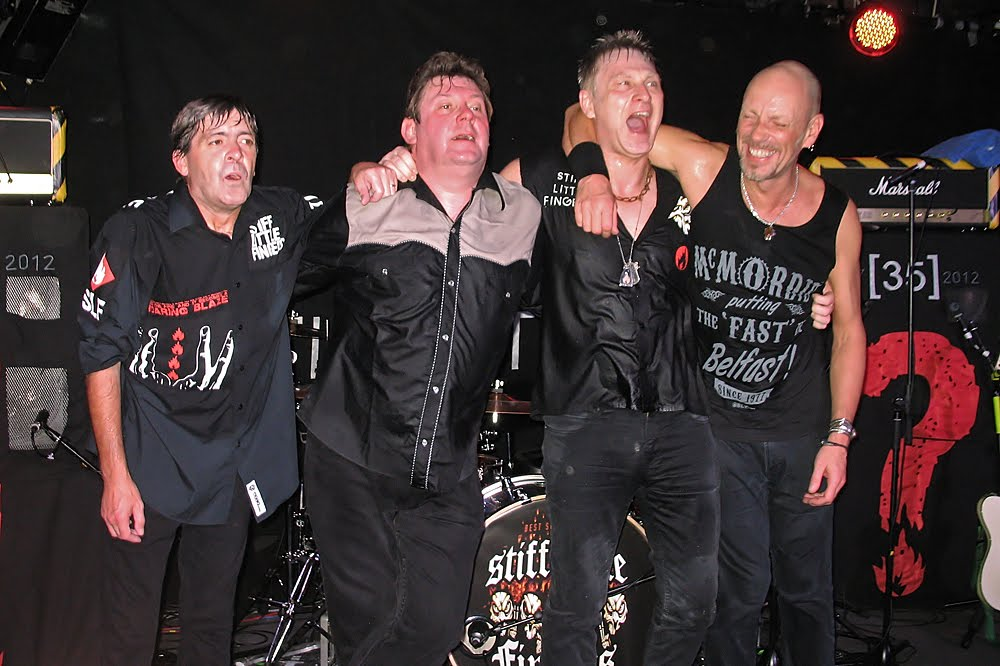
Stiff Little Fingers 11 November 2012, The Slade Rooms, Wolverhampton

On 16 October 2013, the band launched a project on Pledgemusic to raise funds for the album to be released in March 2014. The project reached its funding goal within 5 hours. Recording was completed in January 2014 and the album, titled No Going Back was released through PledgeMusic on 15 March 2014 and to the general public on 11 August 2014. A tour in support of the album kicked off in early 2014 and included dates in the US on the Summer Nationals tour with The Offspring, Bad Religion, The Vandals, Pennywise and Naked Raygun. The album was the band's first UK chart success since 1983's "All The Best" and their first number 1 record on the BBC Rock Album Chart.

== Personnel ==
=== Current line-up ===
- Jake Burns – lead vocals, guitar (1977–1982, 1987–present)
- Ali McMordie – bass, backing vocals (1977–1982, 1987–1991, 2006–present)
- Ian McCallum – guitar, backing vocals (1993–present)
- Steve Grantley – drums, backing vocals (1996–present)

=== Former members ===
- Henry Cluney – guitar, vocals (1977–1982, 1987–1993)
- Bruce Foxton – bass, vocals (1991–2006)
- Brian Faloon – drums (1977–1979)
- Jim Reilly – drums (1979–1981)
- Dolphin Taylor – drums, backing vocals (1981–1982, 1987–1996)

== Discography ==
- Inflammable Material (1979)
- Nobody's Heroes (1980)
- Go for It (1981)
- Now Then... (1982)
- Flags and Emblems (1991)
- Get a Life (1994)
- Tinderbox (1997)
- Hope Street (1999)
- Guitar and Drum (2003)
- No Going Back (2014)

== Books on Stiff Little Fingers ==
- Burns, Jake; Parker, Alan (2003). Stiff Little Fingers: Song by Song. Sanctuary. ISBN 978-1-86074-513-3.
- Link, Roland (2009). Kicking up a Racket: The Story of Stiff Little Fingers, 1977-1983. Appletree Press. ISBN 978-1-84758-145-7.
- Link, Roland (2014). What You See is what You Get--: Stiff Little Fingers, 1977-1983. Colourpoint Books. ISBN 978-1-78073-056-1.
