= Ali McMordie =

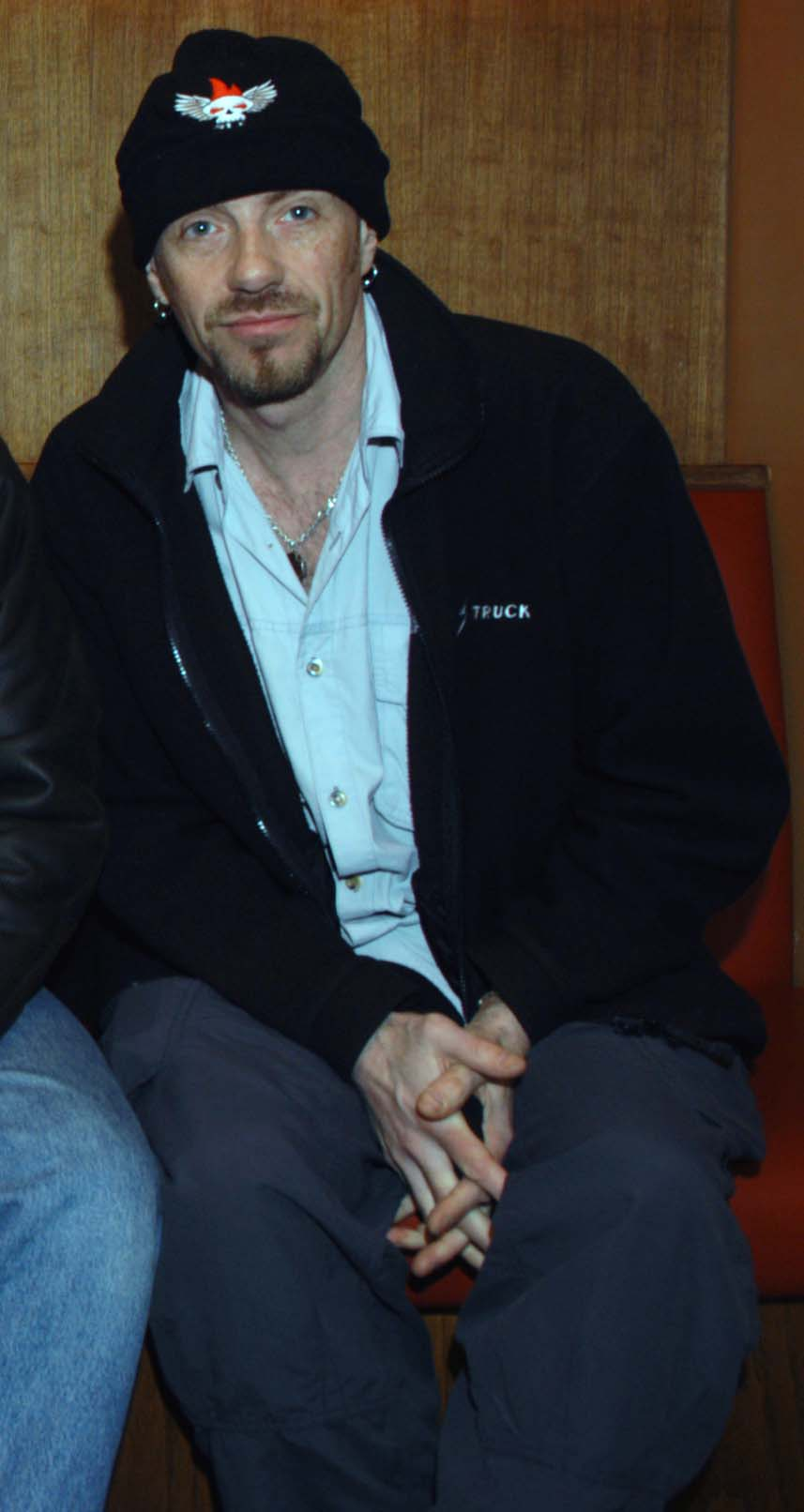
- McMordie, in a 2006 promotional photo for Stiff Little Fingers

Background information
- Also known as: Ali McMordie
- Born: Alistair Jardine McMordie; 31 March 1959 (age 66)
- Origin: Belfast, Northern Ireland
- Genres: Punk; rock; pop
- Instruments: Vocals; bass
- Years active: 1977–present
- Labels: Chrysalis; Rough Trade; Rigid Digits

Alistair Jardine "Ali" McMordie (born 31 March 1959) is a bass guitarist, best known as a founding member of Stiff Little Fingers, playing with the band from 1977 until they broke up in 1983, and joined them on the first few years of reunion tours five years later.

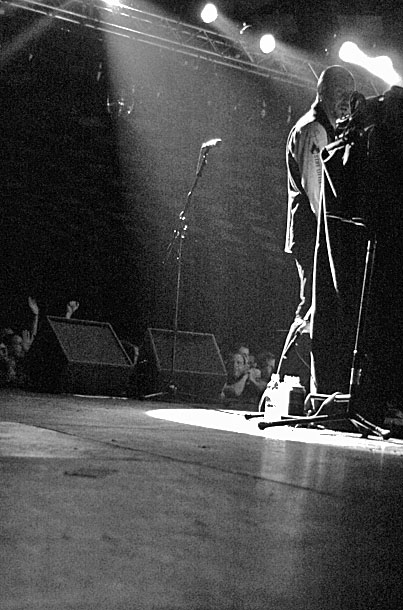
McMordie performing on stage.

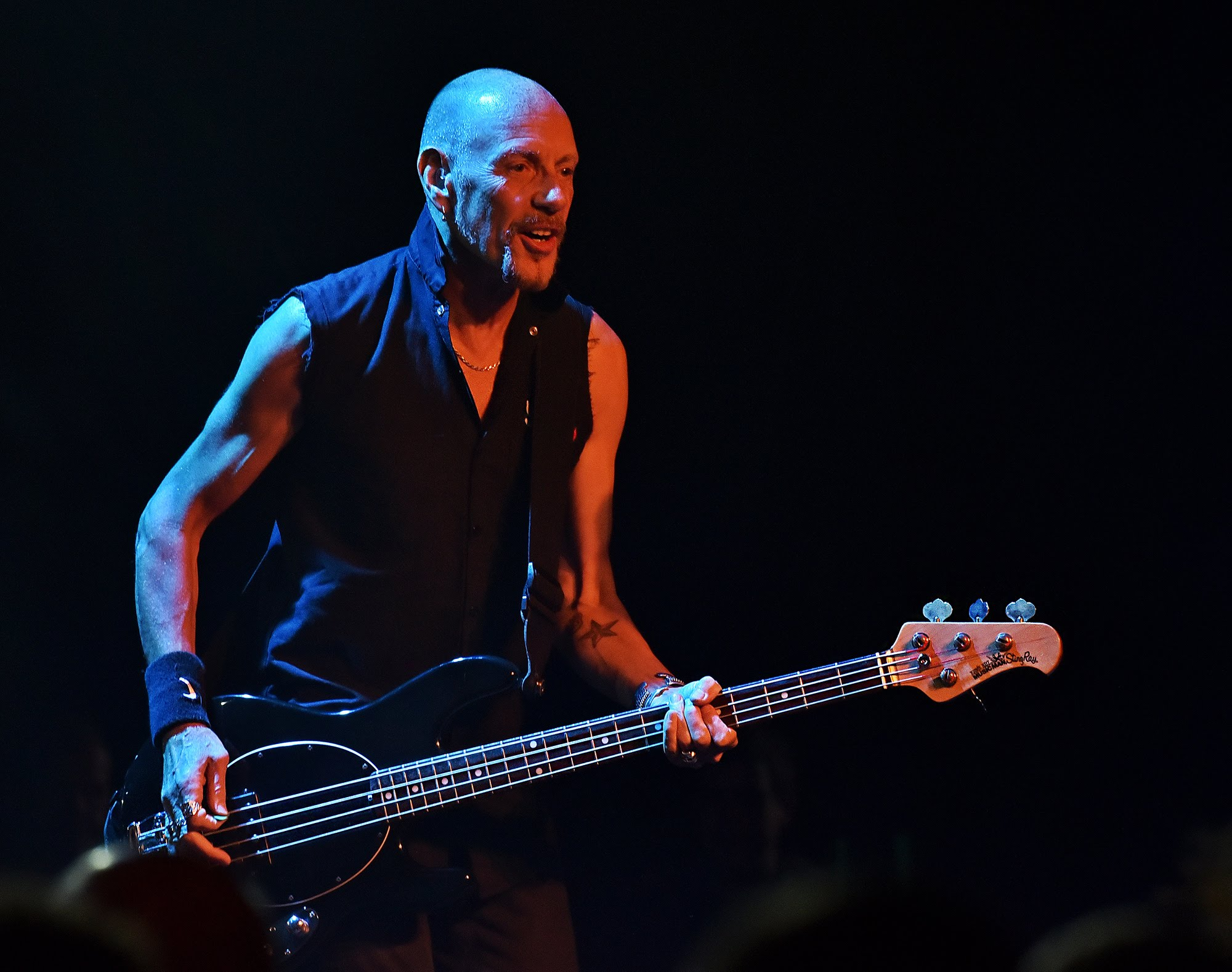
Ali McMordie at KK Steel Mill, Wolverhampton, 2019

After Stiff Little Fingers disbanded in 1983, McMordie joined a group of Reading musicians in the newly formed dance-punk band, Friction Groove. They secured a deal with Warner label, Atlantic, and went on to record an album - The Black Box - in Berlin and Brussels, from which the first single ("Time Bomb") charted very briefly.

Around 1986 he provided, along with other Friction Groove members, the core band behind Sinéad O'Connor, who had just arrived in London from Dublin. Ali was later sacked.

Between 1992 and 1994 Ali McMordie was executive producer for the Peace Together Irish concert events. Since 1994 he has been the tour manager for American artist Richard Hall AKA Moby (with whose band he has sometimes played bass). Ali has also been used as the live bassist for Belfast singer-songwriter Dan Donnelly, having played in Dan's live band at the Beautiful Days Festival 2006 in Devon.

In 2006, it was announced that McMordie was to rejoin Stiff Little Fingers for their current tour, and subsequently that he was rejoining the band on a permanent basis. As of 2026, he is still playing bass with SLF.

Besides being a live musician, McMordie runs Alistair McMordie Tour Management.
