= Jake Burns =

Irish musician (born 1958)

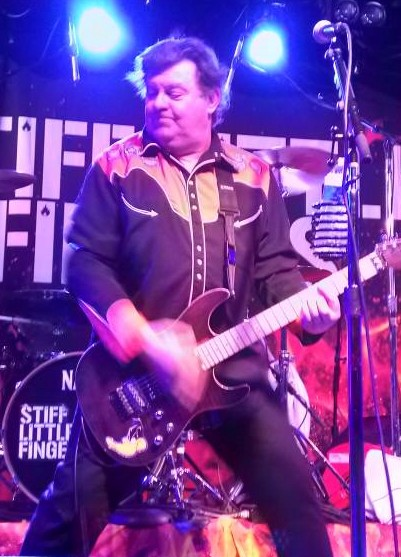
- Burns, performing with Stiff Little Fingers in 2019

Background information
- Born: John Burns; 21 February 1958 (age 68); Belfast, Northern Ireland
- Genres: Punk rock
- Instruments: Vocals, guitar
- Years active: 1977–present
- Labels: Chrysalis, Rough Trade, Rigid Digits

John "Jake" Burns (born 21 February 1958) is a singer and guitarist, and is best known as the frontman of Stiff Little Fingers, although he has also recorded with Jake Burns and the Big Wheel, 3 Men + Black, and as a solo artist.

== Early life ==
Burns was born in Belfast, Northern Ireland, and grew up in Joanmount in Ballysillan. Burns's mother was a seamstress, and his father was a machinist in a textile machinery factory/steel foundry, where he was a shop steward, and his socialist views were an influence on Burns. Prior to punk, Burns's musical influences included Rory Gallagher, Dr. Feelgood, Graham Parker, and Bob Marley.

== Career ==
=== Stiff Little Fingers ===
Burns started off his career at Belfast Boys' Model School with a rock covers band, Highway Star, which consisted of Burns, Gordon Blair, Henry Cluney, and Brian Faloon. Gordon Blair subsequently left the group to join Rudi, and Ali McMordie joined, about the time the band discovered punk.

They were briefly named the Fast, but as there was already a group of that name they changed it to Stiff Little Fingers, taken from the song of the same name that had appeared on Pure Mania, the 1977 album by the Vibrators.

Apart from a five-year gap from 1983 to 1987, Stiff Little Fingers have been active since 1977 to the present day and have released ten studio albums.

=== Solo work ===
In 1981, Burns made his acting debut in an episode of the BBC's Play For Today series entitled Iris in the Traffic, Ruby in the Rain, written by Belfast-born poet and playwright Stewart Parker, which also featured the rest of Stiff Little Fingers effectively playing themselves as 'The Band'.

After the breakup of SLF in 1983, Burns formed Jake Burns and the Big Wheel. The band consisted of Burns on vocals and guitar, Steve Grantley on drums, Sean Martin on bass guitar, and Pete Saunders on keyboards. Big Wheel recorded a total of three singles, "On Fortune Street", "She Grew Up" and "Breathless". A compilation album, also called On Fortune Street, was released after the band's demise, in 2002.

In 1987, Burns disbanded Big Wheel, and Stiff Little Fingers reformed, because they were "skint and wanted to make a bit of cash to get back to Ireland for Christmas".

From about 2001 to 2005, Burns was involved in a side project with Pauline Black of the Selecter, called 3 Men and Black. This involved Black touring with three male artists from the late 1970s, early 1980s doing acoustic versions of songs they are famous for, and talking a little about how they came to write the songs etc. The line up for the concerts was fairly fluid, and has included such people as Bruce Foxton, J. J. Burnel, Eric Faulkner and Nick Welsh.

On 27 March 2006, Burns released a solo album titled Drinkin' Again.

In 2009, Burns formed a Chicago punk rock supergroup called the Nefarious Fat Cats to raise money for local charities. Notable members include John Haggerty (Pegboy, Naked Raygun), Joe Haggerty (Pegboy), Joe Principe (Rise Against), Scott Lucas (Local H), Herb Rosen (Beer Nuts, Right of the Accused) and Mark DeRosa (Dummy). Mr. Burns also contributed guitar and vocals on a track of the Black Sheep Band charity record for Children's Memorial Hospital, A Chicago Punk Rock Collaboration for the Kids, Vol 1.

In 2016, Burns joined an acoustic "supergroup" formed by Kirk Brandon, of Spear of Destiny called Dead Men Walking which also included David Ruffy and John "Segs" Jennings, both of Ruts DC.

== Personal life ==
Burns lived in London for over ten years from 1978 after Stiff Little Fingers had relocated there. His first wife lived in Newcastle upon Tyne, and after their marriage, he moved to Newcastle, where he lived for 16 years, becoming a supporter of Newcastle United F.C. He is also an avid supporter of the Northern Ireland national football team.

Burns's second wife, Shirley, is American and they have lived in Chicago since 2004. Burns would eventually become a US citizen, partially so he could help vote out Donald Trump.

== Discography ==
=== With Stiff Little Fingers ===
see Stiff Little Fingers#Discography

=== Jake Burns and the Big Wheel ===
Albums

- On Fortune Street (2002), EMI

Singles

- "She Grew Up" (1984), Rigid Digits – UK Independent no. 36
- "On Fortune Street" (1985), Rigid Digits
- "Breathless" (1987), Jive – UK no. 99

=== With 3 Men + Black ===
- Acoustic (2005), A2E

=== With Dead Men Walking ===
- Unofficially Official: Live In Bristol 2016 (2016)

=== With Ruts DC and Kirk Brandon ===
- "Kill the Pain" (2017), Westworld Recordings

=== Solo ===
Albums

- Drinkin' Again (2006), EMI

Compilation appearances

- Poxmen of the Horslypse: A Tribute to Horslips (2017), Shite'n'Onions: "Warm Sweet Breath of Love"
