= Jimmy Monaghan =

Irish folk singer

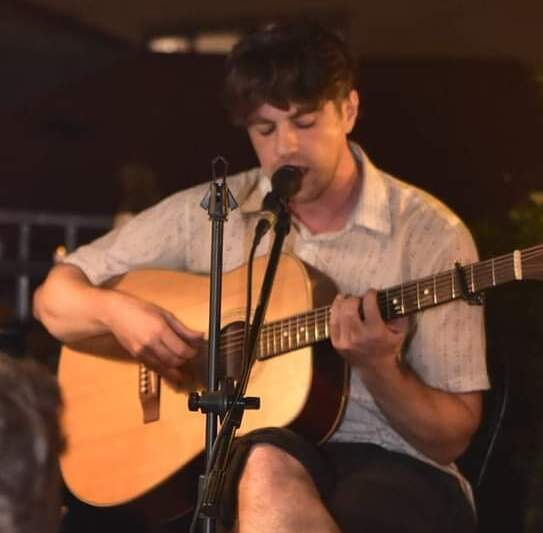
- Monaghan performing at Hanoi Social Club, Hanoi, 2018

Background information
- Born: James Monaghan; 25 February 1988 (age 38); Danbury, Connecticut, United States
- Origin: Belmullet
- Genres: folk; rock; ambient; lo-fi
- Instruments: vocals; guitar; piano; drums
- Works: The Pope's Sister, Cloves
- Years active: 2007–present
- Labels: Ghost Home Recordings, Rusted Rail, Psychonavigation, Dramacore

Jimmy Monaghan (Irish: Seamus Ó Muíneacháin) is a musician from Belmullet, Ireland. He has released music as a solo artist, and as a member of the anti-folk band Music for Dead Birds. He was listed as one of the top ten Galway-based musicians by The Irish Times in 2011. Irish music website Nialler9 has referred to him as "one of the more singular and quietly prolific voices working in Irish electronic music right now."

== Early life ==
Monaghan was born in Danbury, Connecticut, USA, and moved to Ireland at the age of six. He is of Irish and Italian descent.

Boxing

As a teenager, he was an amateur boxer, winning four Irish national titles, and representing Ireland internationally. He won a silver medal at the 2004 Four Nations tournament and received the Western People Sports Star award the same year.

== Music career ==
Music For Dead Birds

In 2007, he formed Music for Dead Birds with drummer Dónal Walsh in Galway city. Their debut album, And then it rained for seven days, was released in 2009 by the Irish record label Rusted Rail. This was followed by the independently released The Pope's Sister, a concept album about the influence of the Catholic church in Ireland, in 2011, Vitamins in 2014, and Pagan Blessings in 2018.

Solo Work

In July 2012, Psychonavigation Records released his debut solo album Seamus O'Muineachain. The Irish Times reviewed the album positively, calling it a "tremulous if tranquil success." To promote the album he performed at Electric Picnic and Whelan's, Dublin.

He followed this up with Cloves (2017), City of Lakes (2019), Blue Moon Set (2020), Different Time Zones (2022), Isthmus (2022), Liminality (2024), Cage of Time (2025), and Island of Flowers (2026). His work has been featured on BBC Radio 6 Music, KEXP, and in international publications including Rockerilla, The Irish Post, and All About Jazz.

The Connacht Tribune has described his music as "ambient, instrumental soundscapes with piano melodies, gentle guitar, percussion and field recordings."

Other musical projects

In 2012, he released an album with Aisling Walsh under the name Christian Bookshop. Hot Press wrote that the project was "an acoustic folk duo in the classic mode, with a decidedly lo-fi approach." Also during 2012, he played the drums for the Galway-based folk band Yawning Chasm.

From 2013-2014, he released a trilogy of lo-fi punk albums under the name The Crytearions. Irish website Thumped called the project "Uncompromising, entirely unpolished and, in places, not entirely pleasant."

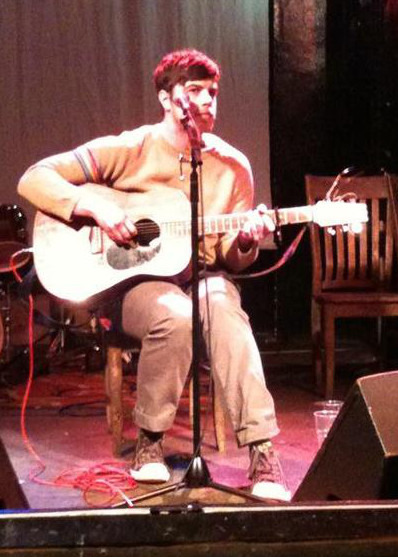
Jimmy Monaghan performing at 93 Feet East, London, 2012

Musical Influences

Monaghan has stated that his early musical influences were Irish traditional music and nu-metal. He has also noted Elliott Smith, Sebadoh, Hiroshi Yoshimura, Pink Floyd, Enya, and Conor Walsh as influences.

== Writing ==
In 2011, his radio drama Thumb was shortlisted for the RTÉ PJ O'Connor Award.

In 2022, he began writing under the pseudonym Jay Honeycomb. Working primarily in music journalism, he contributed to the webzine PopMatters, interviewing musicians including Mike Scott and Eiko Ishibashi.

In June 2022, he self-published the novella Post-Bliss.

== Personal life ==
He is an amateur chess player. In 2024, he was awarded the title of Arena Candidate Master by FIDE.

As of May 2026, he is based in Bangkok, Thailand.

== Discography ==
As Seamus O'Muineachain

Albums

- Seamus O'Muineachain, 2012
- Cloves, 2017
- City of Lakes, 2019
- Blue Moon Set, 2020
- Different Time Zones, 2022
- Isthmus, 2022
- Liminality, 2024
- Cage of Time, 2025
- Island of Flowers, 2026

EPs

- Stamford, CT. Circa 1941, 2014
- Blood Apple, 2015
- Unnamed Cafe, Hoang Hoa Tham, 2018
- Sycamore EP, 2021

With Music for Dead Birds

Albums

- And then it rained for seven days, 2009, Rusted Rail
- The Pope's Sister, 2011
- Vitamins, 2014
- Pagan Blessings, 2018

EPs

- Black Tides Falling, 2010
- Your Brand New Life, 2015
- Nail & Tooth EP, 2017

Singles

- English Weed/What A Waste, 2015.
- Summer in Suburbia/Untied, 2020.

As The Crytearions

Albums

- The Crytearions, 2013, Dramacore
- I See What It Is And I Am Scared, 2013
- These Songs Hate You, 2015

Compilations

- The Crytearions: Selected Recordings from the Album Trilogy, 2016

Other

- Christian Bookshop, Owl & Hat Records, 2012
- Spain, 2019

Compilation Appearances

An Taobh Tuathail Vol. 7, RTE, 2015

== Bibliography ==
- Post-Bliss. Ghost Home Publishing. 2022. ISBN 9798793313360.
