= The Pope's Sister =

Studio album by Music for Dead Birds
- Released: October 31, 2011
- Genres: Indie rock, lo-fi
- Length: 25:42

Music for Dead Birds chronology
And then it rained for seven days (2009)	The Pope's Sister (2011)	Vitamins (2014)

Professional ratings
Review scores
Source	Rating
AU Magazine	Positive
Ptolemaic Terrascope	Positive
BBC Radio Ulster	Positive
Galway Advertiser	Positive
GoldenPlec	Negative

The Pope's Sister is the second studio album by Irish anti-folk band Music for Dead Birds.

== Background and release ==
The album was recorded by the group's frontman, Jimmy Monaghan, using a 4-track cassette recorder. The lo-fi sound was inspired by the album Sebadoh III. Monaghan has stated that the lyrical content “is not a strong statement against the Catholic church, more that it is a wry observation of the people involved with it and how it affects the personalities and relationships of families and friends.” The album was released on Halloween day, 2011.

In promotion of the album the group played as an opening act for And So I Watch You From Afar.

== Reception ==
It received mainly positive reviews, with Terrascope writing "By the time you get to “Release the Dogs” you find you are fully immersed in the album, the twisted guitar lines hooking you in with relentless ease." In a review for Across the Line on BBC Radio Ulster, the album was described as "at once hugely original and amazingly accessible". A review in Alternative Ulster stated "The Pope’s Sister is a highly imaginative gambit from Galway and Mayo “anti-folk” band Music for Dead Birds."

In an overwhelmingly negative review for the website GoldenPlec, reviewer Claire Kane shared "There is nothing less pleasing to the ears than a band that seems as though they are trying their hardest to achieve a particular sound, and that is all this album seems to be about."

The album was listed by RTE 2fm DJ Dan Hegarty as one of the top 50 Irish albums of 2011.

== Track listing ==
All tracks are written by Jimmy Monaghan

No.	Title	Length
1.	"Gretchen Ross"	1:59
2.	"The Only male Nun In Town"	2:12
3.	"In The Lighthouse"	2:10
4.	"Ageing Hippy"	2:19
5.	"The Doctor's Daughter"	2:03
6.	"The Candlemaker's Sister"	4:32
7.	"Drop Skills"	2:52
8.	"Release The Dogs"	2:09
9.	"Turn Yourself Inside Out"	1:54
10.	""The Electrician's Father""	3:32

== Personnel ==
- Jimmy Monaghan – vocals, guitar, drums
