= Music for Dead Birds =

Irish anti-folk band

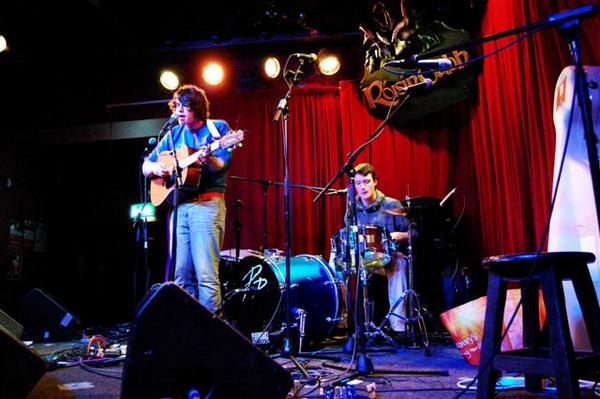
- Music for Dead Birds performing at the Roisin Dubh, Galway.

Background information
- Origin: Galway, Ireland
- Genres: Indie folk, lo fi, indie rock, anti-folk, rock
- Instruments: voice, guitar, drums
- Years active: 2007 – present
- Label: Rusted Rail
- Members: Jimmy Monaghan, Dónal Walsh
- Past members: Brianna Monaghan

Music for Dead Birds are an anti-folk band from Galway and County Mayo, Ireland. Its members are Jimmy Monaghan (vocals, guitar) and Dónal Walsh (drums).

== History ==
Music for Dead Birds formed in Galway city in 2007. In April, 2009, they released their debut album "And then it rained for seven days" on the Irish independent record label Rusted Rail. The album was self produced by the band and was mainly recorded using a 4-track tape deck. Foxy Digitalis commented "The additional album info describes the recording as taking place in "various sheds, attics & bedrooms in Galway and Mayo." The end result represents clear intentions and highly creative song writing and recording techniques." It also received a positive review in Italian music magazine Ondarock. However, it was also criticised for its lo-fi quality. The song Four Years From Now went on to feature on the soundtrack of the German art project Centerland, which was released by Jellyfant Records in 2013.

In October 2011, the group released their second album "The Pope's Sister". AU Magazine said : "Jimmy Monaghan and co meld Beta Band-esque charm with boldly erratic time signatures and disaffected fuzz." Terrascope also praised the album stating: "By the time you get to “Release the Dogs” you find you are fully immersed in the album, the twisted guitar lines hooking you in with relentless ease." It was listed by Irish radio DJ Dan Hegarty as one of the top 50 Irish albums of 2011.

The group's third album "Vitamins" was released on 17 April 2014, by the band's own Ghost Home Recordings label, as both a Pay what you want digital download and a limited edition CD run of 100 copies. The album was recorded in one weekend at Data Studios, County Kerry, with recording engineer Tadgh Healy. Critical reception of the album was mixed, with Irish website GoldenPlec referring to it as a "flawed project", while in a more positive review Ptolemaic Terrascope opined: "The sudden stop/starts, so beloved of Seattle residents, do sometimes get a little wearing, but it's never less than intriguing listening, and the good songs have their own chutzpah." Lead track The Farmer's Corn was broadcast by 2fm in Ireland and 2SER in Australia. A music video was produced for the track Magic Witch which received some media attention for its dark content.

They have played with artists such as Lite (band), Angus & Julia Stone Woodpigeon (band), And So I Watch You From Afar & Gilla Band in Galway & Mayo. They have also appeared at 93 Feet East in London, The Space (Connecticut) & The Living Room in New York.

== Discography ==
- And then it rained for seven days, 2009
- The Pope's Sister, 2011
- Vitamins, 2014
- Pagan Blessings, 2018

EP's

- The Day The Water Ran Out, 2009.
- Black Tides Falling, 2010.
- Your Brand New Life, 2015
- Nail & Tooth EP, 2017

Singles

- English Weed/What A Waste, 2015.
- Summer in Suburbia/Untied, 2020

Compilations

- Ball of Wax Vol. 12
- Eardrums Music compilation
- Ball of Wax Vol. 36
- Centerland OST, 2013
