= Christian Bookshop =

Studio album by Jimmy Monaghan
- Released: 2012
- Recorded: 2012
- Genre: Folk
- Label: Owl & Hat
- Producer: Jimmy Monaghan

Christian Bookshop is an album by Irish musicians Jimmy Monaghan and Aisling Walsh released in 2012.

== Recording ==
Christian Bookshop was recorded in the pantry of Monaghan's home in Belmullet County Mayo, and features Monaghan on acoustic guitar and vocals, Aisling Walsh on vocals and percussion, with contributions from Evelyn Walsh on clarinet, Eleta Van Schalkwyk on violin and Trista Monaghan on tin whistle.

Professional ratings
Review scores
| Source | Rating |
|---|---|
| Hot Press | 3/5 stars |
| GoldenPlec | Mixed |

== Track listing ==
All tracks are written by Jimmy Monaghan.

| No. | Title | Length |
|---|---|---|
| 1. | "Singin' Freebird" | 2:55 |
| 2. | "The Past Tense" | 3:17 |
| 3. | "Waste My Time (Thinking of You)" | 2:42 |
| 4. | "Waste My Time (Bluebirds)" | 2:00 |
| 5. | "Stay Clean" | 1:45 |
| 6. | "Folk Singer" | 2:02 |
| 7. | "Penitentiary" | 2:49 |
| 8. | "Mirror In The Lake" | 2:12 |
| 9. | "Sleeping In Bars" | 2:11 |
| 10. | "A Million Stars (These Kids)" | 3:58 |
