= Isthmus (album) =

Studio album by Seamus Ó Muíneacháin
- Released: 1 October 2022
- Recorded: 2022
- Genre: Neoclassical new-age music
- Length: 26:30
- Label: Ghost Home Recordings
- Producer: Seamus O'Muineachain

Seamus Ó Muíneacháin chronology
Different Time Zones (2022)	Isthmus (2022)	Liminality (2024)

Professional ratings
Review scores
Source	Rating
Spectrum Culture	73/100

Isthmus is the sixth studio album by Irish ambient musician Seamus Ó Muíneacháin.

== Background and release ==
Isthmus was recorded after O'Muineachain returned to Ireland from the Czech Republic, and was inspired by the landscape of the Erris region. The album features field recordings and collaborations with cellist Akito Goto. The album had its radio premiere on The Stephen McCauley Show on BBC Radio Ulster on 30 August 2022. The lead single "Lost Fishermen" was broadcast on KEXP, An Taobh Tuathail, KXCI, BBC 6 Music, and Açık Radyo. The album premiered on It's Psychedelic Baby! Magazine on September 27.

== Reception ==
Mike Mineo of Obscure Sound wrote: "There’s an immediate charm to the album’s scenic and lush composure." Nialler9 wrote that the album was "delicately poised and reflective in nature." Raffael Russo reviewed the album positively in the Italian music magazine Rockerilla. In their New and Notable section, the website Bandcamp wrote: "Seamus O’Muineachain takes us to his hometown of Belmullet, Ireland through patient, pensive ambient composition." Writing for Spectrum Culture, Pat Padua said "The EP takes less than 27 minutes to tell its story, but that brief time is used to communicate the patient appreciation of a dreamlike existence on the other side of the world." Simon Lewis of Ptolemaic Terrascope called the album "a gentle, unhurried set of songs which demand to be taken as a whole and when done so prove to be a balm for the soul." It was included on Star's End list of significant releases of 2022.

== Track listing ==
All tracks are written by Seamus O'Muineachain

No.	Title	Length
1.	"Two Bays"	2:16
2.	"Lost Fishermen"	3:05
3.	"Mouth of the Isthmus"	2:37
4.	"Conches"	2:06
5.	"Sound"	3:19
6.	"Fields of Fog"	2:13
7.	"We Went Beachcombing"	1:29
8.	"Almost an Island"	3:47
9.	"Meet Me at the Pier"	2:04
10.	"Haar"	3:32

== Personnel ==
- Seamus O'Muineachain – piano, guitar, keyboard, synth, percussion, dulcimer, field recordings, production
- Akito Goto – cello
