= Altar (NewDad album) =

Studio album by NewDad
- Released: September 19, 2025
- Length: 42:41
- Label: Fair Youth; Atlantic
- Producer: Shrink

NewDad chronology
| Safe (2025) | Altar (2025) |

Singles from Altar
- 1. "Roobosh" Released: 8 July 2025; 2. "Pretty" Released: 5 August 2025; 3. "Everything I Wanted" Released: 12 September 2025

Altar is the second studio album by Irish indie rock band NewDad. It was released on 19 September 2025, via Fair Youth and Atlantic Records in LP, CD and digital formats.

== Background ==
The album, preceded by the band's 2024 release, Madra, and their 2025 Safe EP, was produced by Sam "Shrink" Breathwick, with English songwriter Justin Parker co-writing 7 of the 12 songs. The themes of the album were noted as ambition, identity and homesickness experienced by the band as they travelled to London from Galway.

"Roobosh" was released as the first single of the album on 8 July 2025, alongside a music video directed by Peter Eason Daniels and Rory Mullen. "Pretty" was released on 5 August 2025 as the second single, with a Daniels-directed music video. It was followed by the third and final single of the album, "Everything I Wanted", which was released on 12 September 2025.

== Reception ==
Professional ratings
Review scores
| Source | Rating |
|---|---|
| The Arts Desk | 4/5 stars |
| DIY | 3.5/5 stars |
| The Irish Times | 5/5 stars |
| The Line of Best Fit | 7/10 |
| NME | 4/5 stars |
| The Skinny | 4/5 stars |

Peter Martin of DIY assigned the album a rating of 3.5 stars, describing it as "a stronger, more memorable record, but one which still suffers from a lack of consistency," in comparison to its predecessor.

Writing for the Arts Desk, Graham Fuller rated the album four stars and noted it represents the band moving stylistically from Madra towards "a worldlier perspective married to a comparatively sophisticated but confrontational style." Ed Power of the Irish Times stated, "Brimming with driving bass, spiraling guitar and diaphanous vocals, Altar is beautifully bleak listening," rating it five stars.

The album received a four-star rating from NME, whose reviewer Rhian Daly referred to it as "a beautiful portrait of working out what you're willing to give up and how to keep pushing yourself forward despite the aching within you." In a review for the Line of Best Fit with a rating of seven out of ten, Matt Young remarked, "Altar isn't afraid to polish the edges. Choruses hit harder, drums land sharper, and guitars are sculpted rather than swallowed in reverb." Tara Hepburn of the Skinny gave it a rating of four stars and noted a "more guitar-driven sound" and "a real prestige in the instrumentation" on the album.

== Track listing ==
Altar track listing
| No. | Title | Writer(s) | Length |
|---|---|---|---|
| 1. | "Other Side" | Julie Dawson; Justin Parker | 3:00 |
| 2. | "Heavyweight" | Dawson; Parker | 3:07 |
| 3. | "Pretty" | Dawson; Parker | 3:23 |
| 4. | "Roobosh" | Dawson; Seán O'Dowd; Fiachra Parslow | 3:20 |
| 5. | "Misery" | Dawson; Sam Breathwick | 3:38 |
| 6. | "Sinking Kind of Feeling" | Dawson; O'Dowd; Parslow; Breathwick | 3:28 |
| 7. | "Puzzle" | Dawson; Parker | 3:35 |
| 8. | "Entertainer" | Dawson; Breathwick | 3:23 |
| 9. | "Everything I Wanted" | Dawson; Parker | 4:18 |
| 10. | "Mr Cold Embrace" | Dawson; Parker | 3:23 |
| 11. | "Vertigo" | Dawson; Parker | 3:45 |
| 12. | "Something's Broken" | Dawson; Breathwick | 4:21 |
| Total length: | | | 42:41 |

== Personnel ==
Credits adapted from the album's liner notes and Tidal.

=== NewDad ===
- Julie Dawson – guitar, vocals
- Seán O'Dowd – guitar
- Fiachra Parslow – drums

=== Additional contributors ===
- Shrink – production
- Craig Silvey – mixing
- Sean Genockey – engineering
- Steve Fallone – mastering
- Rory Mullen – creative direction, artwork
- Peter Eason Daniels – creative direction, artwork
- Justin Parker – production on "Heavyweight" and "Everything I Wanted", additional production on "Puzzle"
- Áindle O'Beirn – additional production on "Pretty"

== Charts ==
Chart performance for Altar
| Chart (2025) | Peak position |
|---|---|
| Croatian International Albums (HDU) | 1 |
| Hungarian Physical Albums (MAHASZ) | 11 |
| Scottish Albums (OCC) | 7 |
| UK Albums (OCC) | 43 |
