= Nosebleed (disambiguation) =

Nosebleed also known as an epistaxis, is the common occurrence of bleeding from the nose.

Nosebleed or similar may also refer to:

- Nosebleed section, the highest seats of a public arena
- The Nosebleeds, a British punk rock band of the 1970s
- Nosebleed, a Jackie Chan film which was cancelled because of the September 11 attacks
- Achillea millefolium, or common yarrow, also called the nosebleed plant for its astringent properties
- Nosebleed stakes, the highest stakes offered in poker, generally in reference to games $200/$400 or higher
- "Nose Bleed", a song by Stand Atlantic from the album Was Here
- "Nosebleed", a song by NewDad from the album Madra
- "Nosebleeds" (song), by Doechii
- Nosebleeds (album), a studio album and titular song by American indie pop band MisterWives
