= Vitamin (disambiguation) =

A vitamin is an organic compound and a vital nutrient that an organism requires in limited amounts.

Vitamin may also refer to:

- Vitamin (TV program), a South Korean variety show
- Vitamins (short story), a short story by Raymond Carver
- Vitamins (album), an album by Music for Dead Birds
- "Vitamin", a song by Jamiroquai from Automaton (2017)
- "Vitamin", a song by NCT 127 from 2 Baddies (2022)
- Vitamin (video game series)
