= Phantom Dog Beneath the Moon =

Phantom Dog Beneath The Moon
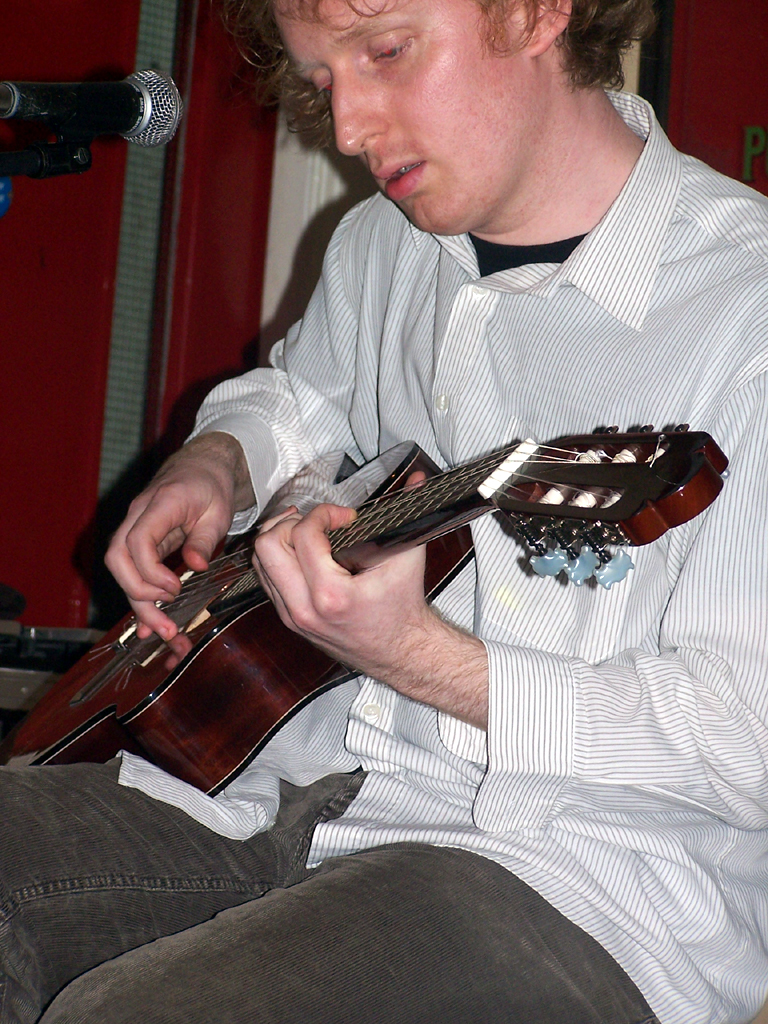
- Phantom Dog Beneath The Moon performing at Forest of Sound, Leeds in 2008

Background information
- Origin: Galway, Ireland, Nottingham, England
- Genres: Indie folk, shoegaze
- Instrument(s): voice, guitar, cello, drums
- Years active: 2005 – present
- Labels: Rusted Rail

Phantom Dog Beneath the Moon are an Irish avant-folk/shoegaze band based in Galway, Ireland. They are singer/songwriter Aaron Hurley and multi-instrumentalist/composer Scott McLaughlin. Contributions have been made to recordings by percussionist Barry Hurley, Loner Deluxe, visual artist/vocalist Andrea Fitzpatrick, accordion player/keyboardist Anne Marie Deacy (Mirakil Whip/Fuaim Bach), trumpet player Ben Isaacs and clarinetist James Wood.

== History ==
They were originally known as Snowmachine and formed in 2005 under that name in Galway, Ireland. An album In a Light was released on Deserted Village the same year. It was described as 'perfect ghost radio music' and as an 'introspective folk band sitting in a bed of electronic sighs, drones and ambiences'.

After discovering there was American alternative country band called Snow Machine, they reverted to Phantom Dog Beneath the Moon. According to Aaron Hurley, the name came about "after watching the Jim Jarmusch film, Ghost Dog, with a full moon shining outside the window". They released a four track EP in 2007 called Through a Forest Only. on Irish record label Rusted Rail. David Colohan (Agitated Radio Pilot) plays guitar on "A Web Emerging From Fog". This time, the music was less reliant on electronics and veered more towards live instrumentation. It was also the first time drums were featured.

In May 2010, The Trees, The Sea in Lunar Stream was released by Rusted Rail. The album features cello, glockenspiel, harpsichord, trumpet (played by Ben Isaacs), double bass, vibraphone, percussion, electronics, bass guitar, classical and electric guitars. The term folk-gaze was coined in reference to the album by Jeanette Leech in Shindig! magazine. Galway Advertiser said "The band have created an album that is haunting, ethereal, atmospheric, personal, and challenging."

In 2011, they were featured on a compilation released by An Taobh Tuathail.

After a long absence, Phantom Dog released another album in March 2017, entitled The Statue of the Hunter is Lost at Sea, again on Rusted Rail. Norman Records in Leeds says "The third album by Phantom Dog Beneath The Moon arrives after seven years away, but it seems that time has only allowed the Irish group to sound more like themselves. Third album The Statue of The Hunter is Lost at Sea has a special feel to it: something in the way that folk songs become swathed in wisps of shoegaze and abstract drones is mysterious and ineffable." For the first time, videos have accompanied a Phantom Dog release. Filmed mostly in Zurich, are 'King Rabbit Stalks Lowlight' and a video for the title track. Folk Radio UK said of the album "Phantom Dog Beneath The Moon have delivered a selection of songs so intimate it sometimes feels like eavesdropping on a late night conversation".

Apple News in speaking about The Statue of the Hunter is Lost at Sea said "Galway's Phantom Dog Beneath The Moon New Album Paints in Exquisite Sonics. Returning after six years, The Statue of the Hunter is Lost at Sea is a lesson in how to write a perfect album."

== Discography ==
- In a Light (2005, Deserted Village)
- Through a Forest Only EP (2007, Rusted Rail)
- The Trees, the Sea in a Lunar Stream (2010, Rusted Rail)
- The Statue of the Hunter is Lost at Sea (2017, Rusted Rail)
