= Suspect Device =

Suspect Device may refer to

- "Suspect Device" (song), a single by Stiff Little Fingers from the 1979 album Inflammable Material
- Suspect Device, an Ohio-based punk rock band of the early 1980s that included Doug Gillard
- Suspect Device (film), a 1995 science fiction television movie starring C. Thomas Howell
