= Sickly Sweet =

Sickly Sweet may refer to:

- "Sickly Sweet", an episode of The Grim Adventures of Billy & Mandy animated TV series
- "Sickly Sweet", a song by NewDad from the 2024 album Madra
