= NewDad =

Irish rock band

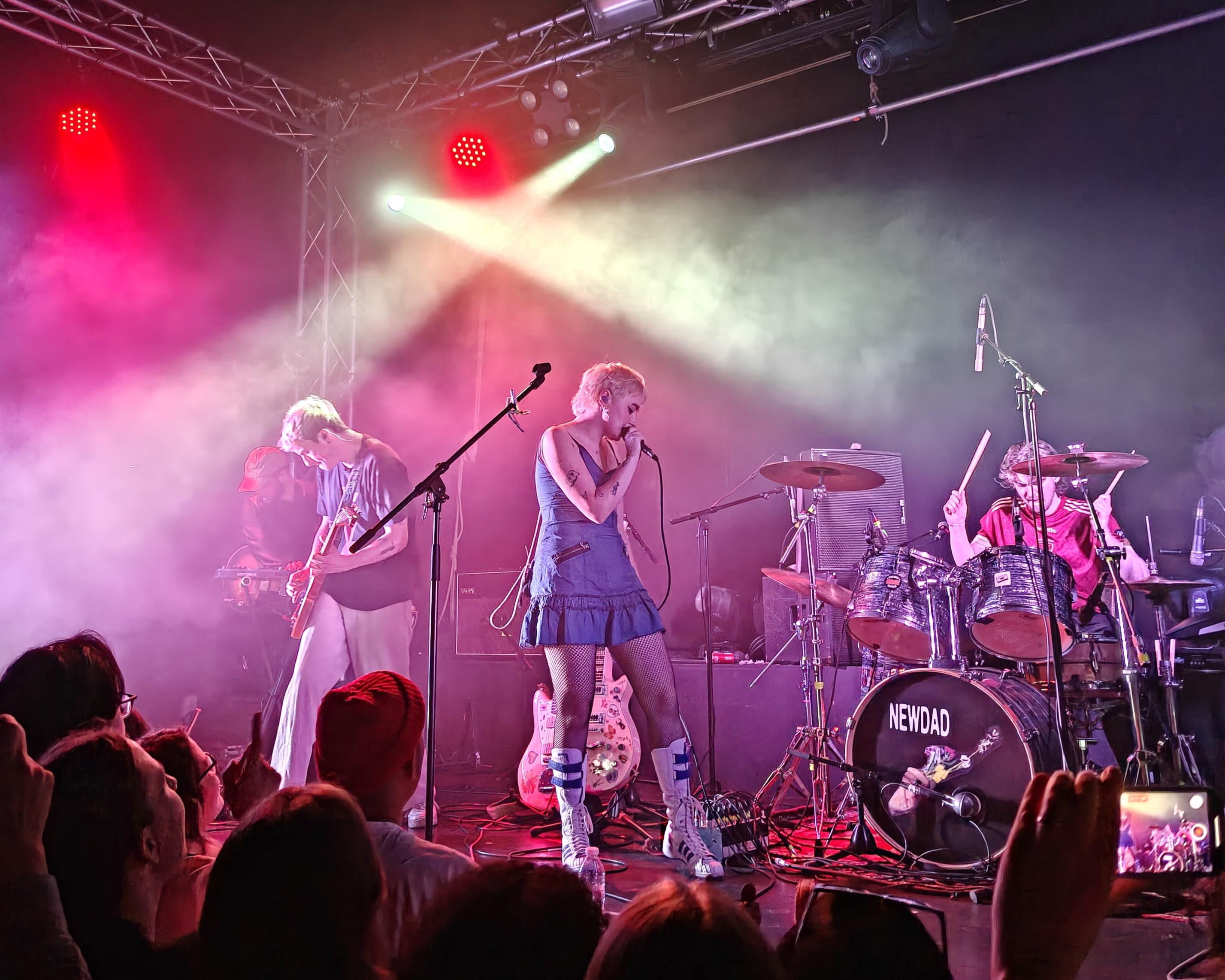
- NewDad performing at The Dome, London in May 2025

Background information
- Origin: Galway, Ireland
- Genres: Indie rock; pop; shoegaze; lo-fi
- Years active: 2018–present
- Labels: Fair Youth; Atlantic
- Members: Julie Dawson; Fiachra Parslow; Sean O'Dowd
- Past members: Áindle O'Beirn; Cara Joshi; Sam Breathwick
- Website: newdad.live

NewDad are an Irish indie rock band from Galway, formed in 2018. The band consists of Julie Dawson (vocals, guitar), Fiachra Parslow (drums) and Sean O'Dowd (guitar). During live performances, the band are currently joined by bass guitarist Marie Freiss.

Their music has been compared to the Cure, Beabadoobee, and Just Mustard by NME magazine. Atwood Magazine wrote of the group: "The band oozes personality with cynical but honest lyrics, colorful visual components, and poignant messages about coping with the, albeit painful, formative experiences." The group have appeared at Glastonbury Festival, All Points East, the Pitchfork Music Festival in Paris, and Lollapalooza.

== Career ==
=== Formation and early career (2018–2020) ===
Julie Dawson, Áindle O'Beirn and Fiachra Parslow started the band while in secondary school at Coláiste Iognáid as a way of avoiding solo performances for their Leaving Certificate practical music exam. Sean O'Dowd, who was studying music technology in Limerick, began recording the band, before eventually becoming a full member. An early feature in local paper the Connacht Tribune wrote "Belying their relative inexperience, Galway band New Dad are fast becoming one of the city's most inventive and enthralling acts." The band released five singles in 2020; "How," "Swimming," "Cry," "Blue" and "I Don't Recognise You," which accrued over two million streams on Spotify. On 5 November 2020, the group recorded a live session for Steve Lamacq's show on BBC 6 Music.

=== Waves EP (2021) ===
Waves EP
Review scores
Source	Rating
GoldenPlec	4/5 stars
DIY	4/5 stars
Dork	4/5 stars

Their debut EP Waves was released in March 2021. Recorded with engineer Chris Ryan in Belfast, the EP features the previously released singles "I Don't Recognise You" and "Blue." God Is in the TV wrote of the EP "Each song juxtaposes fuzzy guitar waves, dexterous basslines, subtle percussive beds, woven with Julie's half spoken half sung vocals that are intimate, evocative and heart puncturing." In a 4-star review DIY magazine wrote of the tracks, "Together they offer a palpable melancholy, one driven by vocalist Julie Dawson's intricate balance of despondency and bite, not least on the subtle spite on the closing title track." The Journal of Music opined: "NewDad posit themselves as both the lovelorn hero and the cut-throat antagonist, switching sides with ease."

=== Banshee EP (2021–2023) ===
Banshee EP
Review scores
Source	Rating
GoldenPlec	4/5 stars
DIY	4/5 stars
Dork	4/5 stars
Gigwise	9/10 stars

In October 2021, the group released the single "Ladybird" and announced their second EP, Banshee. The EP was recorded with Chris Ryan in Belfast and mixed by John Congleton. In January 2022, BBC 6 Music premiered "Say It," the second single from the EP. So Young Magazine wrote of the single; "'Say It' has NewDad sounding more confident and more ambitious." Banshee was released on 7 February 2022. Gigwise, giving it a score of nine out of ten stars, wrote; "NewDad look primed to set the world alight." GoldenPlec wrote; "the themes of 'Banshee' thoughtfully unfold through a dreamscape of helplessness, uncertainty, depression and neurosis." Dork magazine wrote of the EP; "Sonically expansive and colourful, it's a brighter step up from last year's 'Waves EP'." and awarded it four stars out of five.

After the success of Banshee, the band relocated to London. The move also saw O'Beirn being replaced by London-raised bassist Cara Joshi.

=== Madra and other projects (2024) ===
Madra
Review scores
Source	Rating
DIY	2.5/5 stars
NME	4/5 stars
Record Collector	4/5 stars
Uncut	8/10 stars

On 14 September 2023, the band announced their debut album, Madra (which translates as 'dog' from Irish), scheduled for release on 26 January 2024. The announcement was marked by the release of the single "Angel". The album was produced by Chris W Ryan, mixed by Alan Moulder, and recorded at Rockfield Studios. NME listed Madra as their 45th best album of 2024 and one of the ten best debut albums of the year.

==== Solo projects ====
In August 2024, NewDad singer/songwriter Julie Dawson announced the release of her debut solo album, Bottom of the Pool, which released on 13 September 2024.

==== Life Is Strange: Double Exposure ====
NewDad composed a new song, titled "Under My Skin", for Life is Strange: Double Exposure, an episodic adventure game published by Square Enix.

=== Safe EP and Altar (2025) ===
Safe EP
Review scores
Source	Rating
Dork	4/5 stars

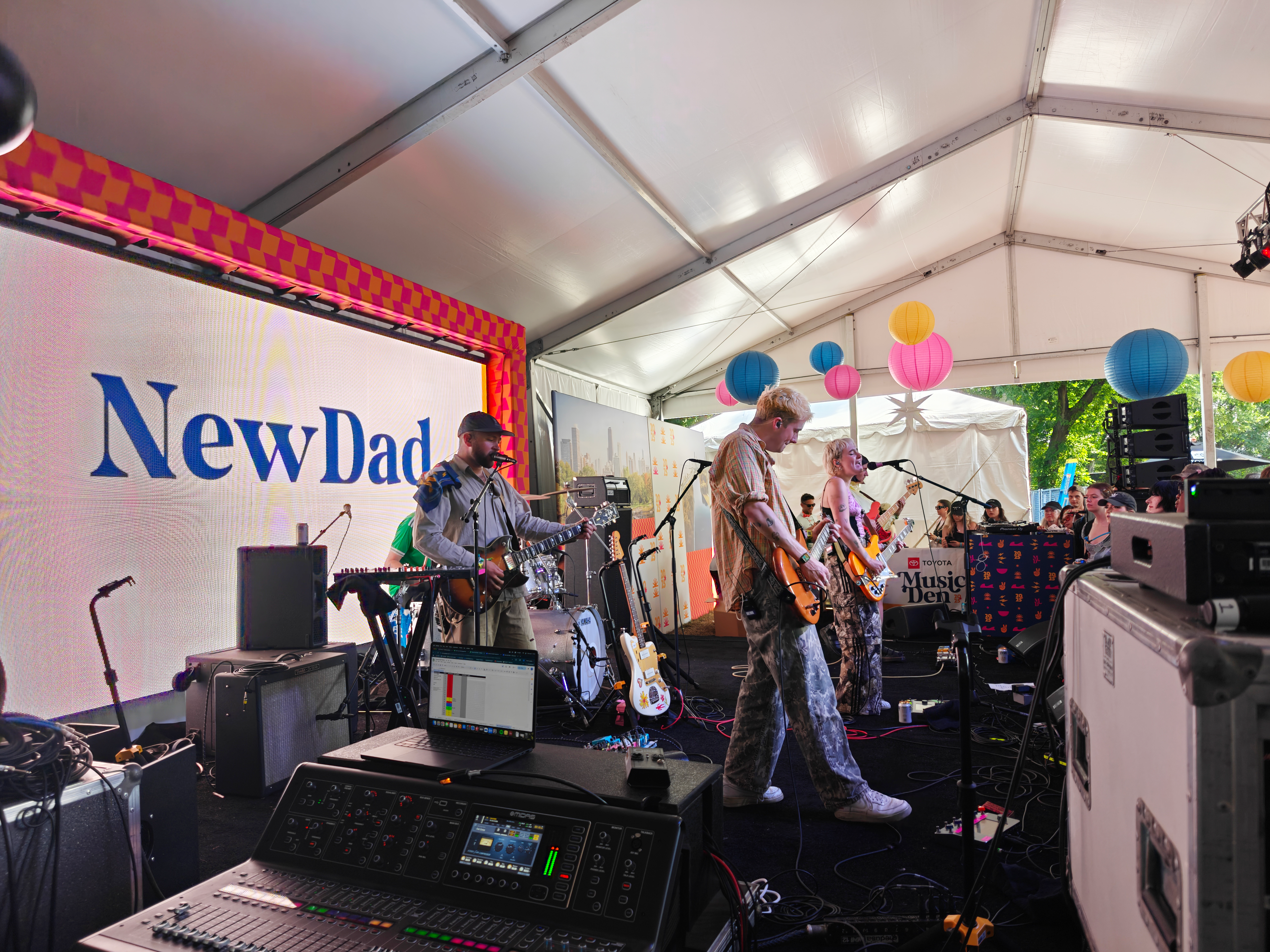
NewDad performing at Lollapalooza Chicago in August 2025

In March 2025, the band announced the departure of bassist Cara Joshi "after some heartfelt conversations", with the band to tour that summer with Marie Freiss deputising. The following month, NewDad announced release of their third EP, Safe, which released in May 2025. In July, NewDad announced their forthcoming second album Altar, which was released on 19 September 2025. The announcement was accompanied by the release of a lead single, "Roobosh". The album featured production from Sam Breathwick, who would also tour with the band in the summer of 2025, and songwriting from Justin Parker.

== Personnel ==
Current members

- Julie Dawson – vocals, rhythm guitar (2018–present)
- Sean O'Dowd – lead guitar (2018–present)
- Fiachra Parslow – drums (2018–present)

Current touring members

- Marie Freiss – bass guitar (2025–present)

Past members

- Áindle O’Beirn – bass guitar (2018–2022)
- Cara Joshi – bass guitar (2022–2025)
- Sam Breathwick – guitar and keys (2025)

== Discography ==
Albums

- Madra (26 January 2024)
- Altar (19 September 2025)

EPs

- Waves (26 March 2021)
- Banshee (9 February 2022)
- Safe (2 May 2025)

Singles

- "How" (2 March 2020)
- "Swimming" (25 March 2020)
- "Cry" (12 June 2020)
- "Blue" (4 September 2020)
- "Blue (Happa Remix)" (20 November 2020)
- "I Don't Recognise You" (27 November 2020)
- "Ladybird" (26 October 2021)
- "Say It" (11 January 2022)
- "ILY2" (30 September 2022)
- "In My Head" (10 May 2023)
- "Break In" (14 June 2023)
- "Angel" (13 September 2023)
- "Let Go" (20 October 2023)
- "Nightmares" (13 November 2023)
- "White Ribbons" (11 January 2024)
