= Liminality (album) =

Studio album by Seamus Ó Muíneacháin
- Released: 7 July 2024
- Recorded: 2022–2024
- Genres: Ambient, new age
- Length: 25:19
- Label: Ghost Home Recordings
- Producer: Seamus O'Muineachain

Seamus Ó Muíneacháin chronology
Isthmus (2022)	Liminality (2024)

Liminality is the seventh studio album by Irish ambient musician Seamus Ó Muíneacháin.

== Background and release ==
O’Muineachain composed and produced Liminality over a two-year period in Thailand, Georgia, and Ireland, and was inspired by "experiences of liminal places; airport terminals, impersonal accommodations, unfamiliar cities and towns." The first track to be released from the album was “Here”, which debuted on the 25th anniversary show of An Taobh Tuathail on the 29th of April 2024. The song “(It’s a Rare Thing) To Daydream” premiered on KEXP on the 12th of May 2024. A video for the song by Thai artist Phannarat Sukkarnka premiered on It's Psychedelic Baby! Magazine on May 13, 2024. “Cinnamon” was played by Stuart Maconie on BBC Radio 6 Music on June 9, 2024.

== Critical reception ==
Writing for The Big Takeover, Dave Franklin called Liminality “a gorgeous, heady, and thought-provoking piece of work.” EKM.CO called the album “a relaxing and powerful demonstration of being in the midst of a transition.” Irish music blog Nialler9 called the track "Cinnamon" “Gorgeous minimal piano stuff” and included it on their list “9 of the best Irish songs this week.” Geno Thackara, a critic for All About Jazz, included Liminality in his list of "Favorite Jazz Albums of 2024", writing "Dreamlike pacing and beautiful simplicity make a beguiling haze that easily feels like it could simply float endlessly between one thing and another."

== Track listing ==
All tracks are written by Seamus O'Muineachain.

No.	Title	Length
1.	"Here"	3:04
2.	"(It’s a Rare Thing) To Daydream"	2:13
3.	"Cinnamon"	2:24
4.	"Rain on Samhain"	2:45
5.	"Between the Bridges"	2:40
6.	"Liminality"	2.07
7.	"Feel Light"	2:05
8.	"Burning Streetlights"	2:46
9.	"Oceans"	2:32
10.	"Still Smouldering"	2:38
