= Blue Moon Set =

Studio album by Seamus Ó Muíneacháin
- Released: 2020
- Recorded: 2020
- Genre: Ambient, New Age
- Length: 34:33
- Label: Ghost Home Records
- Producer: Seamus O'Muineachain

Seamus Ó Muíneacháin chronology
City of Lakes (2019)	Blue Moon Set (2020)	Different Time Zones (2022)

Professional ratings
Review scores
Source	Rating
Rockerilla	Positive

Blue Moon Set is the fourth solo album by Irish ambient musician Seamus Ó Muíneacháin. The album was broadcast on several major radio stations, including BBC Radio 6, RTÉ, KEXP, and WFMU, and received a positive critical reception.

== Background and release ==
The album was recorded in O'Muineachain's hometown of Belmullet, County Mayo, Ireland, from January to March 2020, and was subsequently released during the first wave of the COVID-19 pandemic in the Republic of Ireland. The album had its premier on KDHX on 17 March 2020, and was released three days later, both digitally and as a limited edition blue cassette tape, on March 20. Several music videos were created for the album, including a video for 'Slow Closing Day' by Irish experimental film-maker Maximilian Le Cain.

== Track listing ==
1. "Crestfalling" – 3:34
2. "In The Burrows" – 2:41
3. "The Space Where You Once Were" – 3:33
4. "Windows/Chloe" – 5:53
5. "Slow Closing Day" – 4:07
6. "Try" – 3:34
7. "Brambles" – 3:19
8. "Still" – 3:34
9. "Rushlight The Factories" – 4:18
