= Different Time Zones =

Studio album by Seamus Ó Muíneacháin
- Released: 7 January 2022
- Recorded: 2021
- Length: 24:47
- Label: Ghost Home Recordings
- Producer: Seamus O'Muineachain

Seamus Ó Muíneacháin chronology
Blue Moon Set (2020)	Different Time Zones (2022)	Isthmus (2022)

Professional ratings
Review scores
Source	Rating
Business Post	3.5/5 stars
Rockerilla	positive

Different Time Zones is the fifth studio album by Irish ambient musician Seamus Ó Muíneacháin.

== Background and release ==
O'Muineachain wrote the album while living in the Czech Republic. The album was released on January 7, 2022, through Ghost Home Recordings. Tracks from the album were broadcast by RTÉ Raidió na Gaeltachta, KEXP, and KXCI. Music videos were produced for the tracks "Over", "Summer Lightning", and "Dogwood".

== Critical reception ==
Writing for Business Post, Tony Clayton-Lea opined, "O'Muineachain has graduated from ingénue to skilled practitioner, fusing found sounds with beautifully drifting instrumental pieces primarily influenced by rural Irish landscapes." Foxy Digitalis opined that; "These pieces feel like they could fall apart at any moment; a sonic house of cards that is improbable and magnetic."

== Track listing ==
All tracks are written by Seamus O'Muineachain.

No.	Title	Length
1.	"Over"	2:47
2.	"Summer Lightning"	4:48
3.	"If Only"	3:04
4.	"Almost"	2:53
5.	"Foraging for Wild Garlic in a Light Snow"	3:19
6.	"In Czechia, Under Stars"	1:45
7.	"Dogwood"	2:52
8.	"Vltava/Shannon"	3:19
