= Belmullet Aerodrome =

Small airfield in the west of Ireland

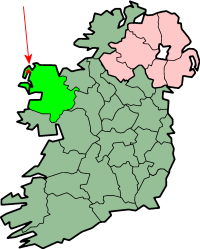
- Belmullet, County Mayo, Ireland
- IATA: BLY; ICAO: EIBT

Summary
- Airport type: Private
- Operator: Comhar Iorrais Teo
- Serves: Belmullet, Ireland
- Elevation AMSL: 150 ft (46 m)
- Coordinates: 54°13′22″N 010°01′51″W
- Interactive map of Belmullet Aerodrome

Runways
Direction	Length		Surface
Direction	m	ft	Surface
07/25	450	1,476	Grass
- Source: Ireland AIS

Belmullet Aerodrome is located 2 nautical miles (4 km; 2 mi) west of Belmullet (Irish: Béal an Mhuirthead), a town in County Mayo, Ireland. The aerodrome, licensed by the Aeronautical Services Department of the Irish Aviation Authority, is located at an elevation of 150 feet (46 m) above mean sea level. It has one runway designated 07/25 with a grass surface measuring 450 by 18 m (1,476 by 59 ft); the airfield is part of the community sports ground.
