= Vitamins (album) =

Studio album by Music for Dead Birds
- Released: April 17, 2014
- Genre: Indie rock, Folk rock
- Length: 30:38

Music for Dead Birds chronology
The Pope's Sister (2011)	Vitamins (2014)

Professional ratings
Review scores
Source	Rating
Ptolemaic Terrascope	Positive
GoldenPlec	Mixed

Vitamins is the third studio album by Irish anti-folk band Music for Dead Birds.

== Background and release ==
The album was recorded in one weekend at Data Studios, County Kerry, with recording engineer Tadgh Healy. The album was released on 17 April 2014 as both a Pay what you want digital download and a limited edition CD run of 100 copies. Lead track The Farmer's Corn was broadcast by RTÉ 2fm in Ireland and 2SER in Australia. A music video was produced for the track Magic Witch which received national media attention for its dark content.

== Reception ==
Writing for Ptolemaic Terrascope, Simon Lewis said that "The sudden stop/starts, so beloved of Seattle residents, do sometimes get a little wearing, but it's never less than intriguing listening, and the good songs have their own chutzpah." In a review for GoldenPlec, Danny Kilmartin opined "“Vitamins” does have its moments. Its major flaw, however, is its inconsistency and lack of cohesion."

== Track listing ==
All songs written by Jimmy Monaghan.

1. "Forever Wasted" – 2:24
2. "It's Fine" – 3:06
3. "Magic Witch" – 2:48
4. "The Farmer's Corn" – 5:30
5. "Dead Pets" – 3:52
6. "Churchbells" – 2:18
7. "I Could See It" – 1:43
8. "Right Eye Open" – 3:20
9. "Penitentiary" – 2:51
10. "A Better View" – 2:46

== Personnel ==
- Jimmy Monaghan – vocals, guitar
- Dónal Walsh - Drums
