= Yawning Chasm =

Irish folk singer

- Born: Aaron Coyne
- Origin: County Galway
- Genres: Alternative folk
- Instrument(s): Guitar, tenor guitar
- Years active: Since 2009
- Labels: Rusted Rail
- Past members: Abhainn Hession, Jimmy Monaghan
- Website: yawningchasm.bandcamp.com

Aaron Coyne, known professionally as Yawning Chasm, is an Irish alternative folk singer-songwriter from County Galway.

== Music career ==
Coyne was one half of the Galway electro-folk duo Mirakil Whip in the early 2000s. The group, with fellow Galway musician Anne Marie Deacy, released an EP on the Rusted Rail label and performed a tour of South Korea. His debut album as Yawning Chasm, A Shadow Is That Hidden, was released in 2009 by Rusted Rail. The Italian website Ondarock reviewed the album positively, comparing the music to that of Red House Painters. The review website Indieville.com wrote: "The Shadow That Is Hidden may be frustratingly short, but it's also consistently great, and that helps make it one of the strongest psychedelic folk releases in recent memory." In 2013, the track "Peripheral Eyes" featured on the compilation Abandon Reason, which was recorded at an abandoned car park in Galway City. The Quietus wrote that the track was "breezy and light-footed." He released his self-titled album later that year, with The Irish Times writing: "His cosy, wintry, self-titled new album will keep you warm during the cold months." In 2019, Coyne was part of a documentary for RTÉ 2XM that focused on independent artists working in Ireland.

== Discography ==
=== Albums ===
- The Shadow Is That Hidden, Rusted Rail, 2009
- Snarl, 2012
- Yawning Chasm, 2013
- Skylights, 2016
- Songs from Blue Home, 2018
- Us and Then, 2020
- The Golden Hour, 2022
