= Cloves (album) =

Studio album by Seamus Ó Muíneacháin
- Released: 28 June 2017
- Recorded: 2017
- Genre: Ambient, New Age
- Length: 30:52
- Label: Ghost Home Records
- Producer: Seamus O'Muineachain

Seamus Ó Muíneacháin chronology
Seamus O'Muineachain (2012)	Cloves (2017)	City of Lakes (2019)

Professional ratings
Review scores
Source	Rating
The Irish Times	Positive

Cloves is the second studio album by Irish ambient musician Seamus Ó Muíneacháin.

== Background and release ==
O'Muineachain produced the album while living, "a 'boring' life, alone in a small town." The album was released on 28 June 2017 and was broadcast on radio stations including RTÉ, and Star's End, and received a positive critical reception, with PureMzine writing "‘Cloves’ genuinely moves the soul", and The Irish Times naming it their Release of the week on 10 August 2017.

== Track listing ==
1. "Dusks" – 2:36
2. "Sometimes We Fly" – 3:24
3. "Gom" – 4:08
4. "Interval for Avril" – 1:45
5. "The City from Her Bedroom" – 3:18
6. "Forest Frost" – 3:35
7. "Moonfire" – 2:28
8. "Radaitheora" – 3:05
9. "Nightdreaming" – 3:19
10. "Dawns" - 3:14
