= Conor Walsh =

Irish musician

- Born: 1979
- Origin: Swinford, County Mayo, Ireland
- Died: 2016 (aged 36–37)
- Genres: Contemporary classical, ambient, electronic
- Instrument: piano
- Label: Ensemble Music
- Website: conorwalshmusic.com

Conor Walsh (1979–2016) was an Irish musician, composer, and record producer based in County Mayo. He is known for combining classical and electronic music, with the Irish Independent writing, "The Mayo musician's haunting original compositions, which pop up frequently these days on TV and radio, are unwaveringly slow and melancholic."

== Biography ==
Walsh had worked in social care before pursuing music full time and relocating to a rural cottage. In 2013, he toured with Irish musician Hozier. In 2014, he appeared on season 12 of Other Voices.

Walsh's debut EP The Front was released in 2015 by Ensemble Music. The Last Mixed Tape wrote of the release, "Walsh's deft piano playing creates a harmonic body of sound that forms the majestic backbone of 'The Front'".

Walsh died of a heart attack in March 2016. His debut album, The Lucid, was released posthumously in 2019, having been compiled by his sister Fiona Walsh, his friend Enda Bates, who produced his first EP, and fellow musician Rob Farhat. In a four-star review, Eamon Sweeney of The Irish Times wrote that the album "hangs together as a sparkling collection of piano-based gems played in Walsh's rich and unique style". GoldenPlec wrote, "There's an undeniable poignancy in hearing an absent performer play music that is itself so focused on absence". Irish musician Talos sampled Walsh’s music on his track Dawn, The Front.

== Discography ==
=== EPs ===
- The Front, 2015

=== Albums ===
- The Lucid, 2019
