= Seamus O'Muineachain (album) =

Studio album by Seamus O'Muineachain
- Released: 2012
- Recorded: 2011–2012
- Studio: Doolough Studios, Erris; Poppyhill Studios, Naas
- Genre: Ambient, celtic
- Length: 29:59
- Label: Psychonavigation Records
- Producer: Liam O'Connor

Seamus O'Muineachain chronology
Seamus O'Muineachain (2012)	Cloves (2017)

Professional ratings
Review scores
Source	Rating
Hot Press	3/5 stars
Irish Times	3/5 stars

Seamus O'Muineachain is the debut album of Irish ambient musician Seamus O'Muineachain. The album was released by Psychonavigation Records in 2012 and received radio play on national stations such as the Australian Broadcasting Corporation and RTÉ.

== Track listing ==
All tracks are written by Seamus O'Muineachain

No.	Title	Length
1.	"Away With the Fairies"	3:11
2.	"My Negative"	3:08
3.	"I’m Trying to Escape"	2:13
4.	"Any Port In A Storm"	3:33
5.	"Shadowboxing"	2:57
6.	"Providence"	3:02
7.	"I Am Always In Your Power"	3:05
8.	"By Her Window"	3:33
9.	"Down I Go"	2:37
10.	"The Clown"	2:40
