= Patrick Knight (engineer) =

Irish engineer (born c.1790)

- Born: c. 1790 Castlebar, County Mayo
- Died: 1844 (aged 53–54); Trim, County Meath
- Resting place: Old Cemetery, Castlebar
- Occupations: engineer, architect, surveyor, author
- Writing career
- Language: English

Patrick Knight (c.1790-1844) was an Irish engineer, surveyor, architect, geologist, cartographer and folklore collector who was involved in planning and engineering projects in County Mayo in the early 19th century. He died in 1844 and is buried in Castlebar.

== Early life ==
Knight was born around 1790 in Castlebar, County Mayo, to a working-class Catholic merchant family. Along with his brother, Simon, he trained as an apprentice surveyor and cartographer.

== Career ==
=== Early surveying work (1809-1813) ===
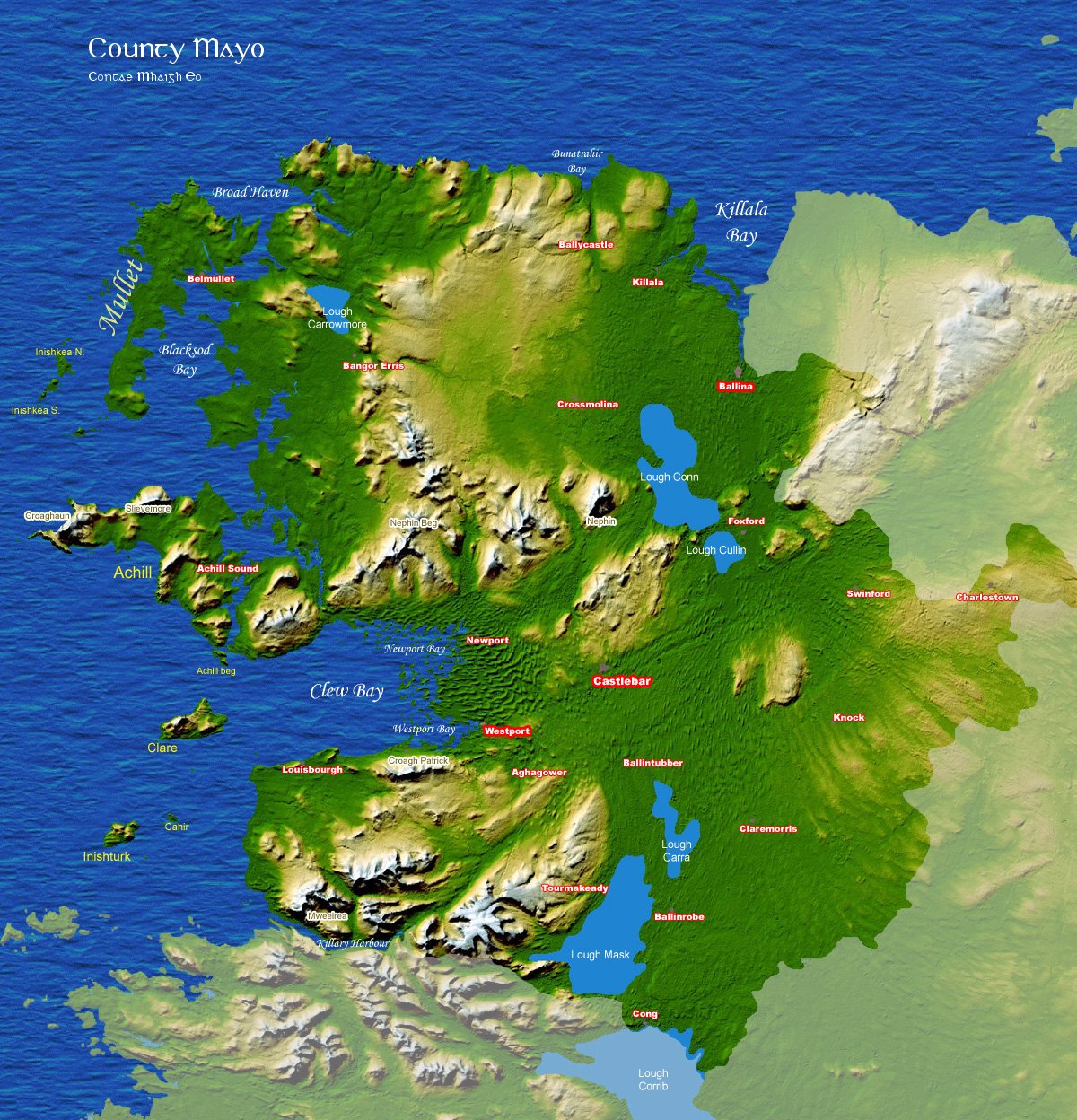
Mayo map with Mullet Peninsula in the upper left

Knight's professional career began in 1809 when he first visited the Erris region. From 1809 to 1812, he worked as an assistant engineer to William Bald in surveys of the bogs of south and east Mayo for the Royal Commission. During this same period, he was employed as an assistant cartographer in Bald's Trigonometrical Survey of County Mayo (1809-1813). This early work established his skills in cartography and civil engineering.

=== Road development (1817-1824) ===
From 1817 to 1822, Knight worked as an assistant engineer for William Bald in creating the Castlebar Road to Tarmon Pier via Belmullet. This infrastructure project was later completed between 1822 and 1824 with the assistance of the engineer Alexander Nimmo. The road was described as having "thrown open Erris to improvement" and connected the remote western regions of Mayo to the rest of Ireland.

=== Design and development of Belmullet (1824-1836) ===
In 1824, Knight received a commission from William Henry Carter, the principal landlord of Erris, to plan and construct a new town at Belmullet. The site was chosen on an isthmus between Blacksod Bay and Broadhaven Bay, requiring reclaimation of land from marshes.

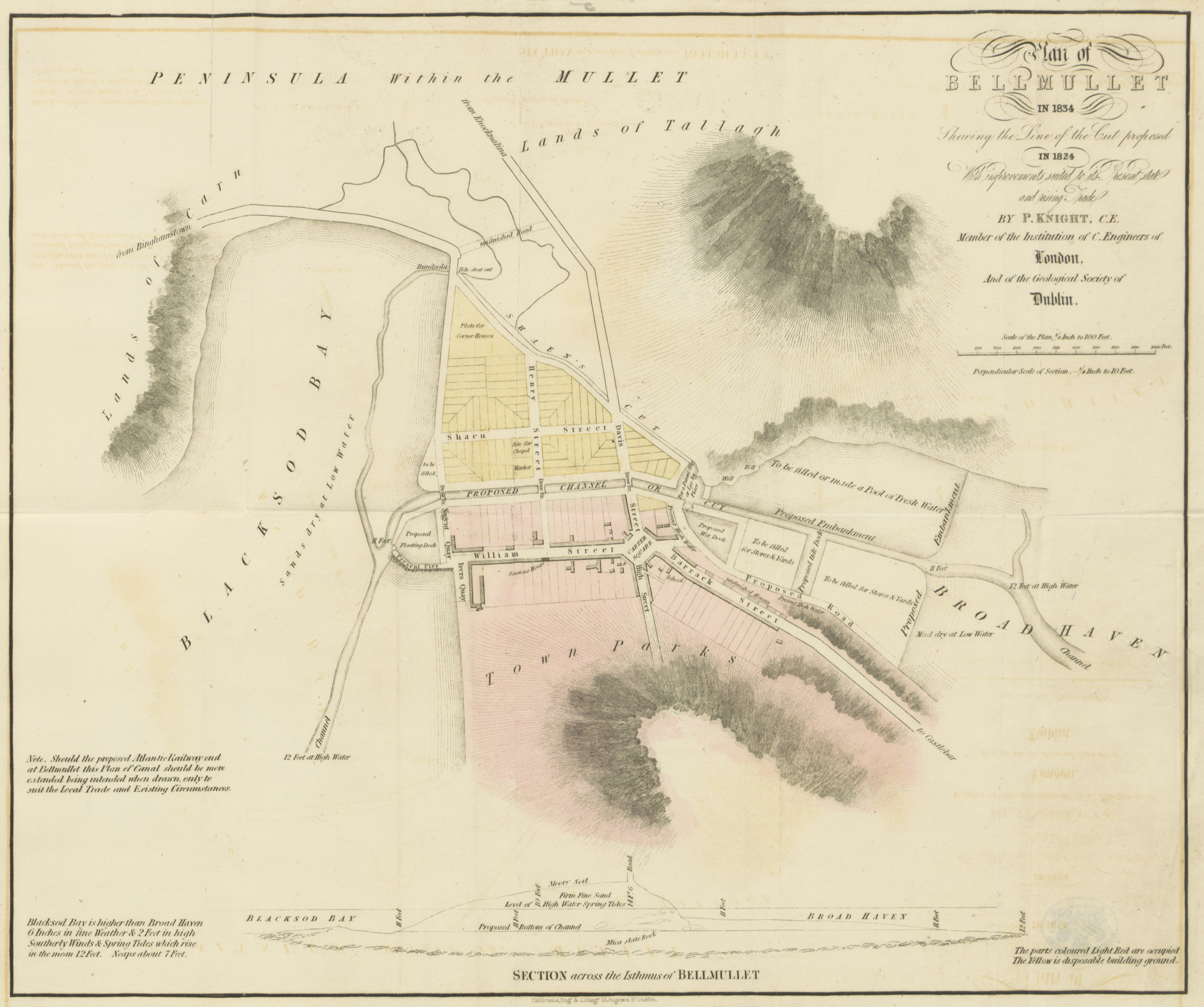
A map in the book of Belmullet town from 1836

Knight's design for Belmullet demonstrated an "understanding of contemporary European urban design" principles. He created a regular rectilinear grid of streets radiating from a central square, built on a constructed polder reclaimed from marsh. Knight contributed £227 of his own funds toward building the town's pier, demonstrating his commitment to the project's success. The pier was executed "in a style equal, if not superior, to any other in the country" and became the only exporting pier in Erris.

=== Proposals ===
Knight also proposed that Belmullet be developed as a transatlantic hub. He advocated for the town to become a packet station with railway connections to Dublin, proposing additional infrastructure including a ship canal across the isthmus, expanded docks, and a railway terminus. His vision included mathematical calculations which sought to highlight Belmullet's advantages over other proposed locations for transatlantic shipping routes.

=== Later career ===
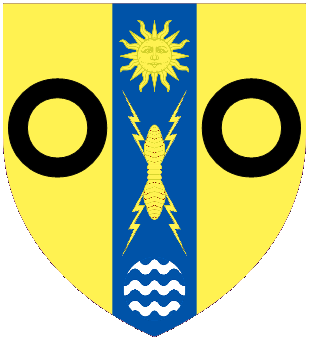
Escutcheon of the Institution of Civil Engineers, of which Knight was a member

By 1840, Knight was recorded as resident in Trim, County Meath. In 1841, he began working at the Valuation Office on Baggot Street, Dublin, where he became a member of the Institution of Civil Engineers. During this period, he may have worked with Richard Griffith of the Valuations Office, who had previously drawn bog maps and reported on Erris for the Royal Commission.

== Personal life ==
During his time in Erris, Knight married Sarah Gamble. Gamble, a local, was the daughter of Arthur Gamble of Surgeview whose family was "known for their generosity to their tenants, particularly in times of hardship". Knight's household became known for its appreciation of poetry, song, and music.

His niece, Olivia Knight (1830-1908), became an Irish-Australian poet and essayist.

== Publications ==
=== Erris in the Irish Highlands and the Atlantic Railway ===
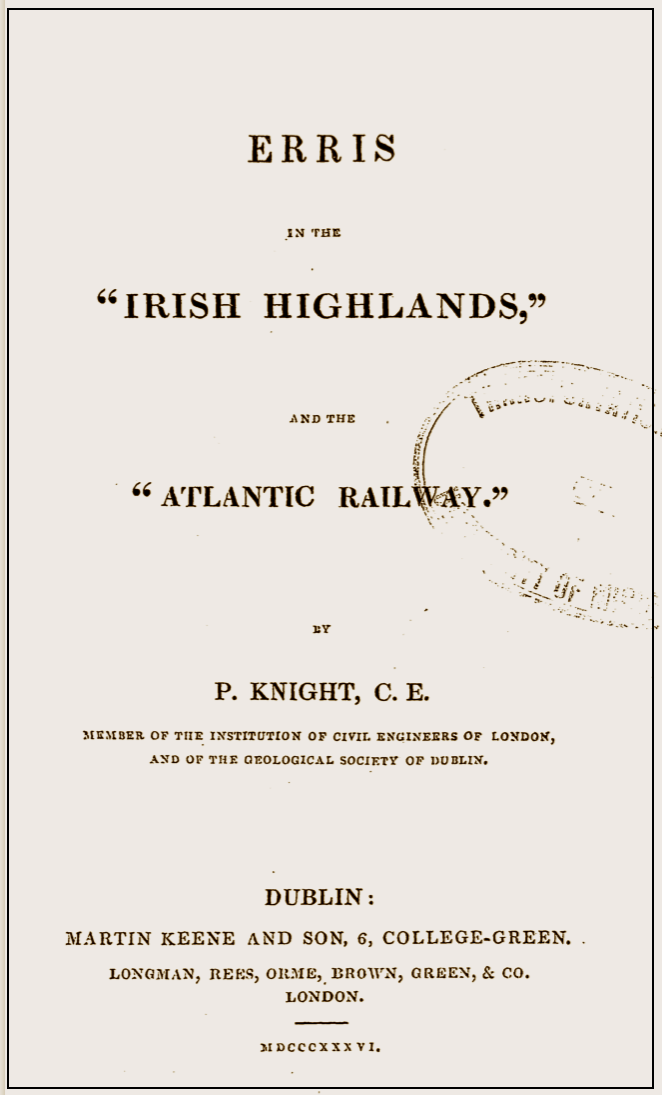
Title page of Erris and the Irish Highlands and the Atlantic Railway by Patrick Knight

Published in 1836, Knight's major work, Erris in the Irish Highlands and the Atlantic Railway, presented an examination of the Erris region, combining geographical study with ambitious proposals for economic development. The book was dedicated to William Henry Carter, acknowledging his role in regional development.

In the publication, Knight described Erris as having been "almost entirely neglected, or even explored, by persons of science or influence". His analysis covered the region's physical geography, including its coastlines, boglands, and mountainous landscapes with elevations up to 2,300 feet. He detailed the area's climate and ecosystem, while also examining the agricultural potential of the soil in the region.

Knight's examination also covered observations of local infrastructure, natural resources, and social conditions. He documented the region's harbours, particularly Broadhaven and Blacksod Bay, analyzing their potential for maritime trade and fishing industry development. His geological observations included studies of the region's mica-slate mountains, quartz deposits, and porphyry dikes.

The book presented proposals for regional development, centred on the Atlantic Railway concept. Knight envisioned this railway as a transformative project that would position Erris at the centre of transatlantic commerce. He outlined plans for connecting Belmullet to Dublin via rail, with additional branches serving other western towns. Knight's infrastructure proposals included plans for harbour improvements, canal construction, and urban development. He emphasised the importance of Belmullet's position between two bays, arguing that the area's geography made it suitable for transatlantic shipping routes. His proposals included engineering solutions for the challenges posed by the region's terrain and climate.

=== Other publications ===
In 1833, Knight published several articles on geology in the Journal of the Geological Society of Dublin.

== Cultural interests ==
Knight also contributed to the preservation of local cultural heritage. He developed an interest in the work of Erris poet Riocard Bairéad, whom he visited at Leam Cottage. Knight described Bairéad as a man of "real genius" and "a more original, feeling, delightful composer in his native language to all the grand and soul-stirring airs of Carolan". Knight documented and preserved several examples of local poetry and song.

== Death and legacy ==
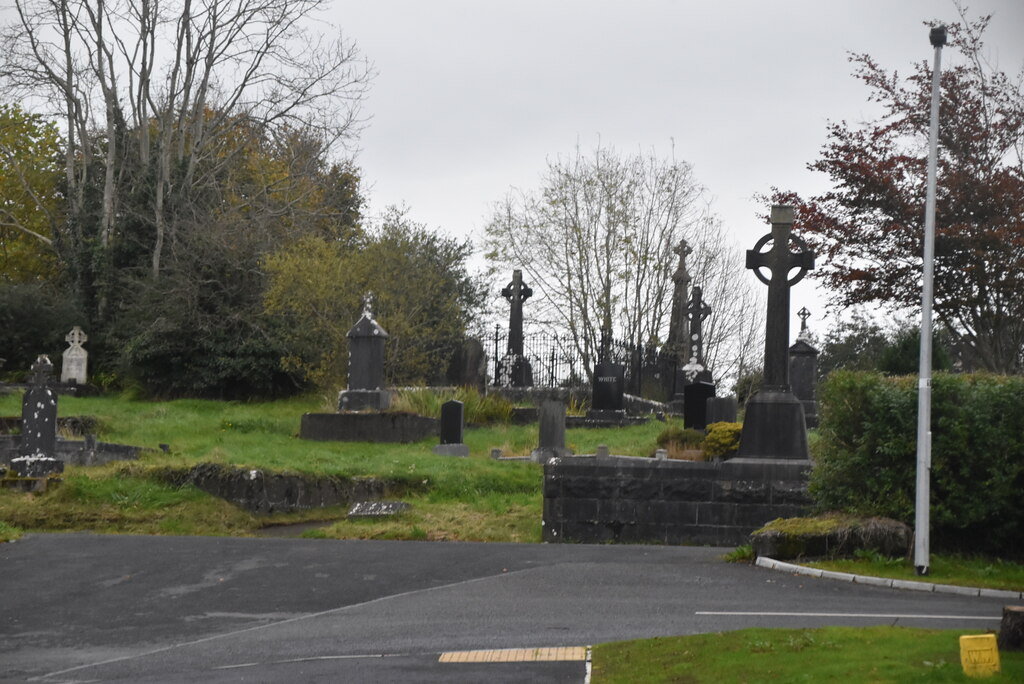
Old Cemetery in Castlebar where Knight was buried

Knight died in 1844, with his death recorded in the minute papers of the Institution of Civil Engineers.

In January 2024, members of Belmullet Town's Bicentenary Committee discovered and cleaned his previously overgrown tomb in the Old Cemetery, Castlebar, laying a wreath in recognition of his contributions to the development of Belmullet.

== See also ==
- History of rail transport in Ireland
- Economic history of Ireland
