= Belmullet Tidal Pool =

Tidal swimming pool in Belmullet, Ireland

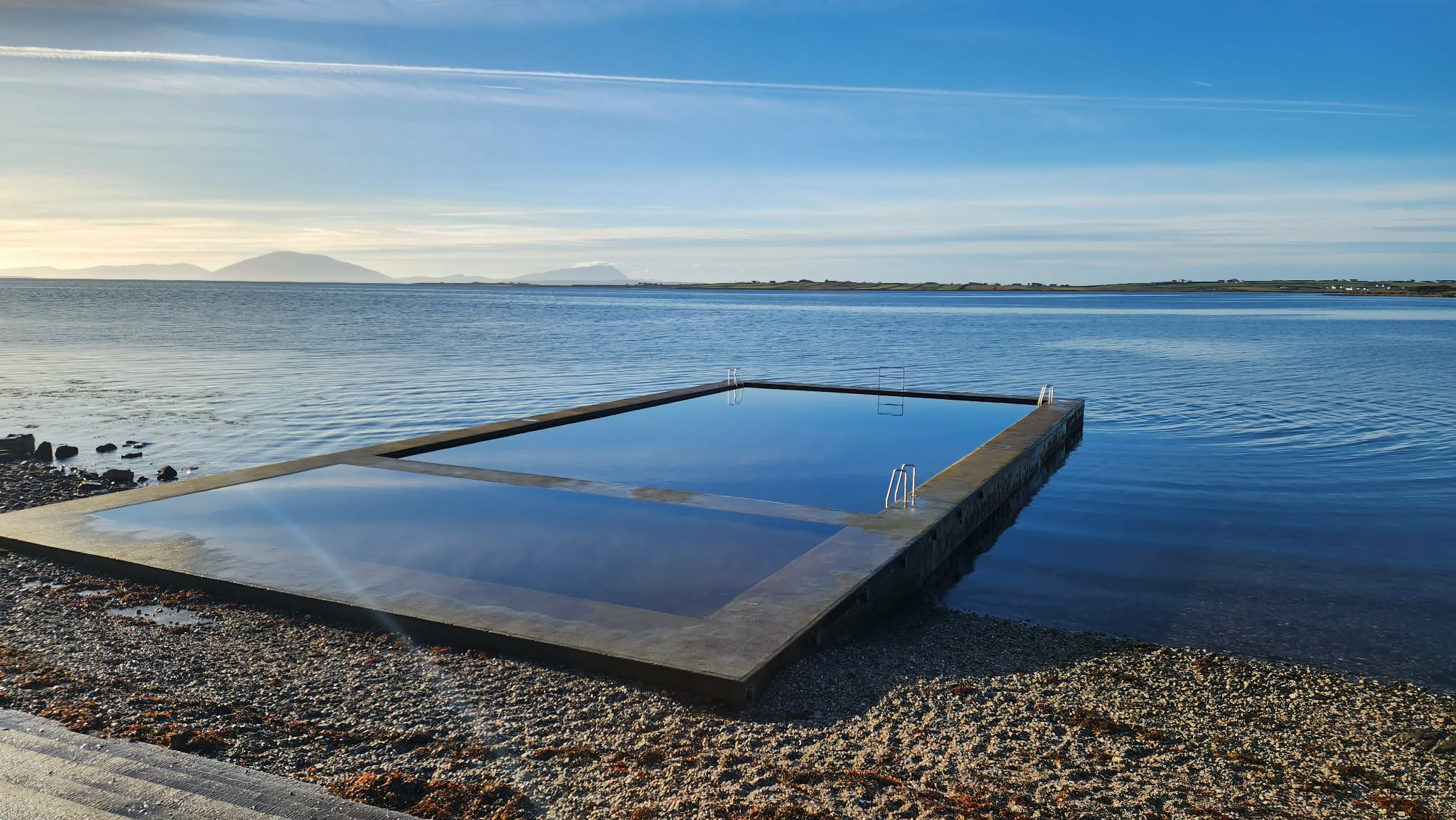
- Belmullet Tidal Pool in 2023
- Interactive map of Belmullet Tidal Pool
- Location: 25 Shore Road, Belmullet, County Mayo, Ireland
- Coordinates: 54.22°N 9.99°W
- Type: tidal, seawater, lido
- Dimensions: Length: 20 feet (6.1 m); Width: 10 feet (3.0 m)

Construction
- Opened: 1984

The Belmullet Tidal Pool is a man-made tidal swimming pool in Blacksod Bay, with access from Shore Road in Belmullet, County Mayo, Ireland.

It was listed as one of the 10 best seawater swimming pools in the UK and Europe by The Guardian, one of the 'world's most dramatic saltwater sea pools' by CNN, one of the six 'best places to swim in Ireland' by VIP, and one of the '10 best sea pools in the British Isles' by Coast. It features in the book "Sea Pools: 66 Saltwater Sanctuaries from Around the World" by Chris Romer-Lee.

== History ==
The idea for a Belmullet tidal pool was spearheaded by local woman Anne Maguire after returning from travels in Sweden. The site of the pool had already been a popular swimming spot in the area. Traditionally, only men swam at the spot, and when women began swimming there in the 1960s, it reportedly attracted criticism from local clergy. Despite this, Maguire and four other women who made up the Belmullet Swimming Club raised funds for the construction of the pool, which was designed by local engineer Paddy McManamon.

It was built in 1984, celebrating its 40th anniversary in 2024.

In 2024, the pool received funding of almost €300,000 under the Outdoor Recreation Infrastructure Scheme to improve the "visitor and user experience to Mayo's only coastal outdoor tidal pool."

== Use ==
The pool is open year-round and is free to use. It is a popular local amenity, used by swimming groups and to give swimming lessons.

The pool has been used as a Performance Arts space.

It has been used as an example for the potential of sea pools on the western coast by Councillor Niall Murphy in Galway.
