= City of Lakes (album) =

Studio album by Seamus Ó Muíneacháin
- Released: 21 June 2019
- Recorded: 2019
- Genre: Ambient, New Age
- Length: 32:58
- Label: Ghost Home Records
- Producer: Seamus O'Muineachain

Seamus Ó Muíneacháin chronology
Cloves (2017)	City of Lakes (2019)	Blue Moon Set (2020)

City of Lakes is the third studio album by Irish ambient musician Seamus Ó Muíneacháin.

== Background and release ==
O'Muineachain produced the album while living in Hanoi, Vietnam. The album was released on 28 June 2017. Lead single Under the Overpass received national radio play on RTÉ. The album found a following in the yoga community, with the yoga instructor Timothy Burgin, reviewing it for Yoga Basics, saying "These beautiful, elaborate, yet introspective neoclassical-ambient instrumental compositions work great played during a gentle yoga practice." It was listed as a "Significant release of 2019" by Star's End.

== Track listing ==
1. Caring - 4:27
2. Bridges - 2:42
3. Us in the Green - 3:13
4. Sands - 3:03
5. Under the Overpass - 3:35
6. Impossible to Know - 5:16
7. Ghosts - 4:08
8. Tristan da Cunha - 2:28
9. New Moon Song - 4:06
