= Riocard Bairéad =

Irish poet and satirist

Riocard Bairéad (aka Dici or Dick Buiread, Richard Barrett) (b.1735–40 – d. 1818/19 ), was an Irish poet and satirist best remembered for his songs Eoghan Coir, a mock lament for a landlord's bailiff, and "Preab san Ól", a drinking song which is said to sum up "his merry philosophy of life". He was among the United Irishmen in his native County Mayo who survived their French-assisted insurrection in August 1798. Bairéad wrote in both Irish and English, and in a macaronic mixture of the two. His satirical style that has been compared both to Jonathan Swift and to Robbie Burns.

== Life ==
Bairéad was born at Barrack near Ely Bay in Belmullet, with sources giving varying dates between 1735 and 1740, a descendant of the Norman Barretts. He eloped with and married Nancy Tollett, daughter of a prosperous Protestant landlord, and after her death would marry Maire Ní Mhóráin with whom he had two children. The family lived relatively isolated in a small cottage on a five-acre farm in Carna. He taught in a small school in the areas. After his death, Maire, who thought little of his poetry, burnt his papers.

Bairéad was a member of the Society of United Irishmen and when in August 1798 1,100 French troops under General Humbert landed in Killala he "turned out" with other rebels. According to local lore he served as pikeman with the French when they put to flight a much large force of loyalist militia in the so-called Races of Castlebar. After the French surrender in September he was arrested but indicted for incitement rather than armed participation he was released after three months. As pointed out by historian Guy Beiner, Bairéad's poetry does not reflect on his experiences in 1798.

At the time of the centenary celebrations for the 1798 rebellion a ballad, "The Men of The West", was set to the air of "Eoghan Coir".

The poem engraved on his tomb stone at Cross Point, to the west of Belmullet, at one point read:

Why spend your leisure bereft of pleasure
Amassing treasure? Why scrape and save?
Why look so canny at every penny?
You’ll take no money into the grave.

His grave fell into a bad state of disrepair and his bones were nearly washed into the Atlantic Ocean after a wild storm. Well-wishers from the town of Belmullet shored up the cemetery wall to ensure another few years of existence for the poet's last resting place.

Coláiste Riocard Bairéad is named after him. The Irish summer college belongs to Gael Linn
