= Alternative Ulster (song) =

1978 single by Stiff Little Fingers

Single by Stiff Little Fingers

from the album Inflammable Material
- B-side: "78 RPM"
- Released: 17 October 1978
- Recorded: May 1978
- Studio: Island Studios
- Genre: Punk rock; power pop
- Length: 2:45
- Label: Rough Trade Records
- Songwriters: Gordon Ogilvie; Jake Burns
- Producers: Ed Hollis; Doug Bennett; Mayo Thompson; Geoff Travis

Stiff Little Fingers singles chronology
| "Suspect Device" (1978) | "Alternative Ulster" (1978) | "Gotta Gettaway" (1979) |

"Alternative Ulster" is the second single by the Northern Irish punk band Stiff Little Fingers. Originally released as a single on 17 October 1978, the song later appeared on the band's 1979 debut studio album, Inflammable Material.

== Background and creation ==
Jake Burns, the lead singer of Stiff Little Fingers, was asked to record "Suspect Device" for a Flexi disc to be included in a Northern Irish fanzine called Alternative Ulster. As "Suspect Device" had already been recorded for release as the band's first single, Burns offered to write another track. Burns described the song as "written in the classic punk mode of having nothing to do", describing the main frustration of Belfast youth of the time as "the sheer tedium of having nowhere to go and nothing to do when you got there".

Working with Eddie and the Hot Rods manager Ed Hollis, the band cut a series of demos for "Alternative Ulster" at Island Studios in London in May 1978. When Island Records turned the group down, they signed with Rough Trade Records. Originally, "Alternative Ulster" was meant to serve as a B-side to "78 RPM", but when the songs were released as a single in October 1978, Stiff Little Fingers decided to make "Alternative Ulster" the A-side.

== Release and reception ==
"Alternative Ulster" was released as a 7-inch single on 17 October 1978 via Rough Trade and Rigid Digits. Shortly following the single release, Stiff Little Fingers went on tour, opening for the Tom Robinson Band, and working on their debut album, Inflammable Material. Burns intended for "Alternative Ulster" to be the closing track on the album, an honor which instead went to "Closed Groove".

Derry-based punk band the Undertones released their debut single, "Teenage Kicks", in the same week as Stiff Little Fingers released "Alternative Ulster", starting a rivalry between the two bands within the Northern Irish punk scene. While the Undertones were accused of ignoring the events of The Troubles in their music, the overtly political lyrics of "Alternative Ulster" and "Suspect Device" drew criticism from the other side. When asked in 2007 if "Teenage Kicks" was the best song about being a teenager, Bono responded, "My soundtrack was more Alternative Ulster by Stiff Little Fingers."

== In modern culture ==
"Alternative Ulster" has appeared in the films Fifty Dead Men Walking, Good Vibrations, Everybody Wants Some!!, and The House of Tomorrow, as well as in the soundtrack for the Xbox 360 and PlayStation 3 game Skate 2. In 2022, the song appeared on the soundtrack of the film Jackass Forever and in Series 3 Episode 5 of Derry Girls on Netflix.
