= Rusted Rail =

- Founded: 2006
- Founder: Keith Wallace
- Genre: Alternative Folk, Psychedelic music
- Country of origin: Republic of Ireland
- Location: Galway
- Official website: rustedrail.com

Rusted Rail is an Irish independent record label that was started in 2006 by Keith Wallace.

Rusted Rail have released albums by artists including Phantom Dog Beneath the Moon, United Bible Studies, The Declining Winter. Music for Dead Birds and Songs of Green Pheasant amongst other artists from Ireland, The UK and Europe.

== History ==
Keith Wallace formed the label after working as station manager for Flirt FM. They release records primarily on 3" CD, but also on standard format CD. The records released by the label have received international attention for their handmade aesthetic and experimental content. CUBS is a group comprising artists who have released material through the label, including Phantom Dog Beneath The Moon, Loner Deluxe, A Lilac Decline, United Bible Studies, and The Driftwood Manor.

== Artists ==
- A Lilac Decline
- Phantom Dog Beneath the Moon
- CUBS
- Directorsound
- Good Sheppard
- So Cow
- The Dovetail Consort
- The Driftwoof Manor
- The Declining Winter
- Yawning Chasm
- Half Forward Line
- Loner Deluxe
- Phosphene
- Songs of Green Pheasant
- Music for Dead Birds
- United Bible Studies
- Songs of Green Pheasant
- Brigid Mae Power
- Agitated Radio pilot
- CWK Joynes
- Plinth
- Mirakil Whip
