= Suspect Device (song) =

Single by Stiff Little Fingers

from the album Inflammable Material
- B-side: "Wasted Life"
- Released: 17 March 1978
- Recorded: 4 February 1978
- Studio: Downtown Radio Studios, Newtownards
- Genre: Punk rock
- Length: 2:42
- Label: Rigid Digits
- Songwriters: Gordon Ogilvie; Stiff Little Fingers
- Producer: Rigid Digits

Stiff Little Fingers singles chronology
| "Suspect Device" (1978) | "Alternative Ulster" (1978) |

"Suspect Device" is the debut single by Northern Irish punk band Stiff Little Fingers, released on 17 March 1978.

== Background and release ==
Stiff Little Fingers – Jake Burns, vocals and guitar, Henry Cluney, guitar, Ali McMordie, bass, and Brian Faloon, drums – made their first public appearance as a punk band on 16 August 1977. Their fourth gig was at the Glenmachen Stables, Belfast on 14 November 1977. At this gig, the band met journalists Gordon Ogilivie and Colin McClelland, who would soon become the group's management team.

Ogilivie showed Burns draft lyrics for a possible song. "Gordon asked me if I'd written anything pertinent where I'd grown up [at which juncture] he literally handed me the finished lyric of 'Suspect Device'. I couldn't believe it. Here was a guy who was thinking along exactly the same lines as I was. I'd go so far to say that from the moment he handed me that piece of paper, the band changed." (Jake Burns)

Burns put a tune to the lyrics and "Suspect Device" was born. Footage of the group performing "Suspect Device" at Belfast's Pound Club on 17 January 1978 - the first time the group played the song live - appeared on an Ulster TV programme It Makes You Want to Spit about the emergence of punk in Belfast.

Stiff Little Fingers recorded the single on Saturday 4 February 1978 at Downtown Radio studios. The release of the record required a record/publishing company and Rigid Digits was formed with the band members and two managers all owning equal shares. "Suspect Device" was released on 17 March 1978.

The front cover of the "Suspect Device" record sleeve is a photograph of explosive inflammatory devices which were being used by the Provisional IRA to fire bomb commercial premises. The back sleeve was a black and white photo of the group taken on the 'peace line' between the republican Falls Road and the loyalist Shankill Road.

A copy of the single was sent to John Peel and within days of its release he was regularly playing it on his Radio One show. Rough Trade's Geoff Travis heard "Suspect Device" on the John Peel show, ordered copies for sale in the Rough Trade shop in London and distributed the single through Rough Trade's recently set up distribution network of independent record shops.

By April, the initial 500 copies had sold out and another 1,500 were pressed. Further re-pressings took place as sales took off. By July 1978, Sounds was reporting that over 10,000 copies of the single had been sold. In October, Melody Maker estimated sales had reached 12,000.

After a proposed contract with Island Records fell through, the band signed with Rough Trade. Following the release of the second single "Alternative Ulster" in October 1978, "Suspect Device" was re-released on Rough Trade on 17 March 1979.

A re-recorded version of "Suspect Device" was the opening track on the debut Stiff Little Fingers album, Inflammable Material, which was released on Rough Trade records in February 1979. Its B-side, "Wasted Life", also appeared on the album.

== Reception ==
The popularity of "Suspect Device" was reflected in the annual Festive Fifty voted for by listeners of the John Peel show. In 1978, it was voted at number four, and in following years, "Suspect Device" would become a regular fixture in the Festive Fifty, placed at number eight in 1979, number 24 in 1980, number 32 in 1981 and number 31 in the reshaped All-Time Festive Fifty in 1982. The single's B-side, "Wasted Life", appeared in the 1979 Festive Fifty at number 18 and in 1980 at number 27.
