= Alternative Ulster =

Northern Irish political publication

AU Magazine
- Categories: Music, Culture, Arts
- Frequency: Monthly
- Founded: 2003
- Final issue: March 2012
- Country: Northern Ireland
- Based in: Belfast
- Language: English
- ISSN: 1740-7311

AU (formerly Alternative Ulster) was a magazine written, designed and published in Belfast, Northern Ireland, which began life in 1977 as a fanzine and later radio show. The magazine was launched in June 2003. 81 issues were published in total, with the final issue being published in March 2012. Although predominantly a music magazine, AU covered other aspects of popular culture, such as movies, comics, games and the arts.

== History ==
Alternative Ulster began life in 1977 as a fanzine in the punk era, co-founded by Gavin Martin.

Alternative Ulster (named after the song of the same name by Stiff Little Fingers) started life in March 2002 as a radio show on Belfast community station Northern Visions, as well as a website. Early the following year, a prototype 'Issue Zero' was launched, promising to provide "the best reportage from the local world and beyond." Local band Therapy?, headlined the official launch party in the Mandela Hall on 6 June 2003. In 2004, the magazine won Magazine of the Year.

The magazine underwent a massive redesign and relaunch in February 2007, when the name officially changed from Alternative Ulster to AU. Though it continued to cover Northern Irish music, the name change reflected the magazine's wider scope of alternative music from around the world.

For Issue 63 AU made the switch from a paid-for title to a free publication. The aim was to increase advertising sales by increasing circulation, and that this would offset the loss of sales. The strategy proved successful, and AU remained a free publication until it ceased in 2012.

AU went under its final and most extensive redesign for Issue 71. The spine was replaced with a saddle stitch, the heavyweight cover was dropped, and the paper was changed from a silk to an uncoated stock. The whole internal design was overhauled, with each section and style being tweaked and improved.

== Content ==
The overall remit of AU was to place the best of Northern Irish and Irish music, culture and lifestyle alongside big international names and content. The ethos was that there was regional talent on a par with that from the rest of the globe, and so it should be treated in the same fashion. From the very first issue regional bands were covered in every way possible, including large features, record reviews, live reviews, news, short pieces and more. There were also many photo shoots conducted with regional acts, and the photography and design were key components of the magazine.

A number of Northern Irish acts appeared as cover stars of the magazine, including Two Door Cinema Club, Snow Patrol, Therapy?, Ash, Duke Special, The Answer, Panama Kings, And So I Watch You From Afar and David Holmes.

While the focus of the magazine was on music, other cultural content was extensively covered, including film, books, arts and more.

== AU Army ==
The 'AU Army' was the magazine's street team. It was created in January 2007 and was largely made up of students who did work experience in the AU offices. Its members distributed stickers and back issues into waiting rooms and ran stalls at gigs in towns and cities around Ireland.

== Logo ==
The first AU logo featured the full words of Alternative Ulster and dominated the masthead. In 2006, the full name was phased out and re-branded as simply AU. The logo featured the letters AU in white writing within a red circle and white border. Initially, the words Alternative Ulster appeared under the circle, but this was later removed, and the circle remained. Instead of dominating the cover, the logo was moved to the top left and the featured artists became the focal point of the issue cover page. The magazine also launched a sticker campaign, where their street team, the AU Army travelled around the country, branding all types of items with the AU logo.

== Staff ==
The magazine employed a large team of writers, photographers and designers from around Ireland and further afield. It also occasionally featured writing by musicians and others, for example Jetplane Landing frontman Andrew Ferris and BBC Radio presenter Rigsy.

- Publisher & Editor in Chief – Jonny Tiernan
- Editor – Chris Jones
- Editor – Francis Jones
- Editor – David McLaughlin
- Editor – Phil Crossey
- Photo Editor – Iona Bateman
- Sub-editor – Chris Jones
- Contributing Editor – Ross Thompson
- Senior Contributor – Edwin McFee
- Design & Illustration – Stuart Bell, Luke Carson, Tim Farrell, Neil Gillespie, Elissa Tiernan
- Photography – Iona Bateman, Alan Maguire, Gavin Millar, Loreana Rushe, Graham Smith
- Advertising Manager – Elissa Tiernan
- Promotions and Marketing Assistant – Kim Barclay
