= Belmullet =

Town in County Mayo, Ireland

Belmullet Béal an Mhuirthead
- Town
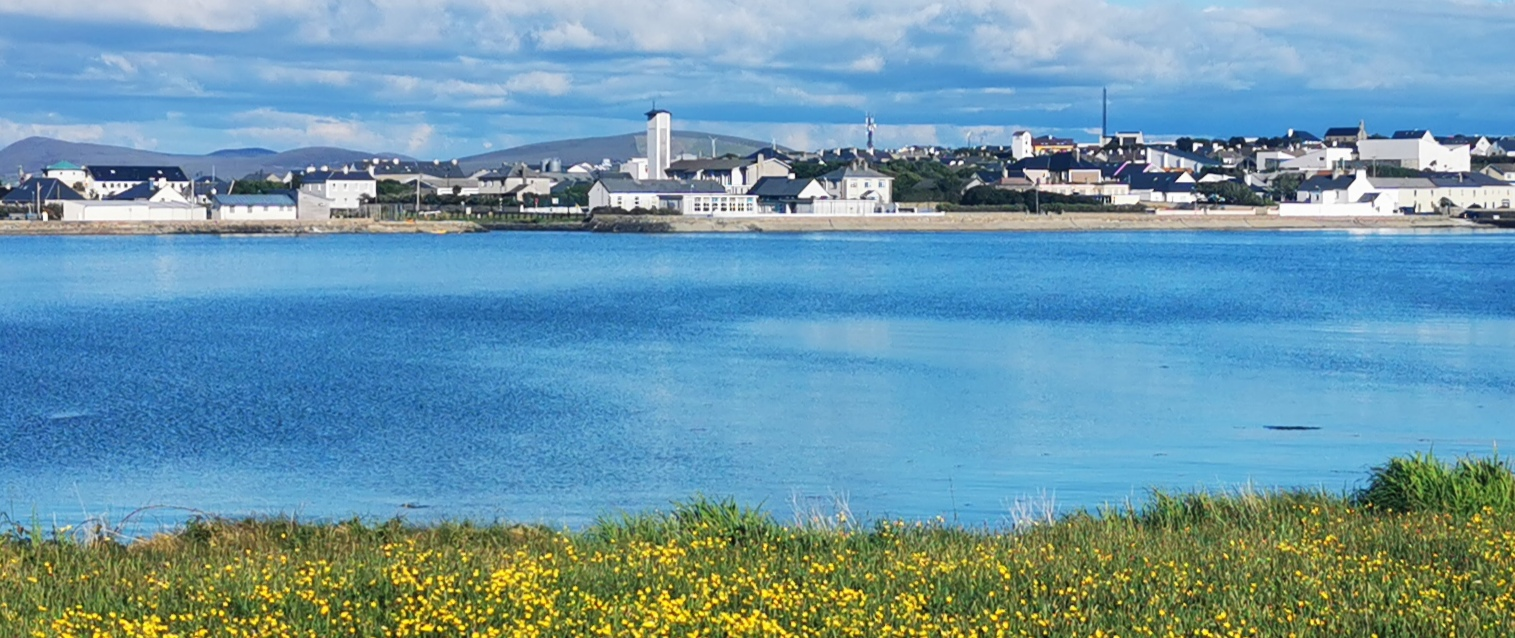
- A view of Belmullet town

- Location in Ireland
- Coordinates: 54°13′30″N 9°59′28″W
- Country: Ireland
- Province: Connacht
- County: County Mayo
- Elevation: 5 m (16 ft)

Population (2016)
  - Total: 1,019
- Irish Grid Reference: F701326
- As this is a Gaeltacht town, the Irish Béal an Mhuirthead is the only official name. The anglicized spelling Belmullet has no official standing.

Belmullet (Irish: Béal an Mhuirthead, meaning 'mouth of the Mullet [Peninsula]', IPA:[ˌbʲeːlənˠˈwʊɾˠhəd̪ˠ]) is a coastal Gaeltacht town with a population of 1,019 on the Mullet Peninsula in the barony of Erris, County Mayo, Ireland. It is the commercial and cultural heart of the barony of Erris, which has a population of almost 10,000. According to the 2016 census 50% of people in the town were able to speak Irish while only 4% spoke it on a daily basis outside the education system.

Belmullet has two bays, Blacksod Bay and Broadhaven Bay, linked by Carter's Canal running through the town.

== History ==
The origin of the name Belmullet is not clear. It may have come from Irish Béal Muileat or Béal an Mhuileat, which has been translated as "mouth of the isthmus". Bernard O'Hara in Mayo: Aspects of its Heritage suggests that "A change from 'L' to 'R', which is quite common in Irish, may have given Béal an Mhuireat which in turn became Béal an Mhuirhead". It has also been suggested that the latter half of the name may refer to the fish or the star shape used in heraldry.

=== 18th century ===
According to Richard Pococke, in about 1715, Sir Arthur Shaen "began building a little town" where Belmullet now stands. During the reign of Queen Elizabeth I, an admiral chased pirates into Broadhaven Bay, hauled his boats across the isthmus, and caught up with them near the Iniskea Islands. To drain the area and form a passageway from Blacksod Bay into Broadhaven Bay, Shaen had a canal excavated, known thereafter as Shaen's Cut, large enough for small boats to pass through from one bay to the other. However, little development of the town occurred, and by 1752 the canal was choked up and impassable. Belmullet was the scene of Monster meetings of the Land League at the end of the 19th century. In the early 19th century Belmullet consisted of little more than a few thatched buildings.

=== 19th century ===
In 1820, the first post office in Erris opened in the new town of Belmullet. In 1822, a coastguard station was built. William Henry Carter had inherited huge tracts of Shaen's land in Erris when he married Shaen's daughter and began to put plans in place to develop the town. Carter tasked engineer and Castlebar native Patrick Knight with designing and planning the new town between Broadhaven and Blacksod bays. Knight published his town plan in his 1836 treatise Erris in the Irish Highlands, in which he described Belmullet as a "mirage in the desert", positioned between two sheltered bays which provided potentially safe anchorage for Atlantic trade. A new road was built which connected Belmullet with Castlebar, which was completed in 1824. In 1825, Carter built a pier large enough to accommodate vessels of 100 tons. Carter's stated objective was to "create a home market for produce that did not previously exist nearer than thirty miles by land," and his aim was to thrust the older village of An Geata Mór (Binghamstown), a village founded by the powerful Bingham family on the Mullet peninsula into a secondary position. By 1826, the Erris Hotel was opened.

In 1829, Alexander Nimmo, an engineer on the Erris roads, wrote the following: "at Belmullet, the advance is quite surprising; the place only commenced four years ago; it now consists of about seventy respectable houses etc... five ships were loaded with grain and kept; iron hoops and coal were imported; spirits, beer and wine. British manufacturers and tea and sugar were sold; the produce of the fisheries were admitted to a market." In 1836, Patrick Knight documented in his book "Erris in the Irish Highlands" that during the construction of the Belmullet-Bangor road, workers "unnecessarily destroyed the fine dolmen in the glen rather than divert the road a few feet to one side".

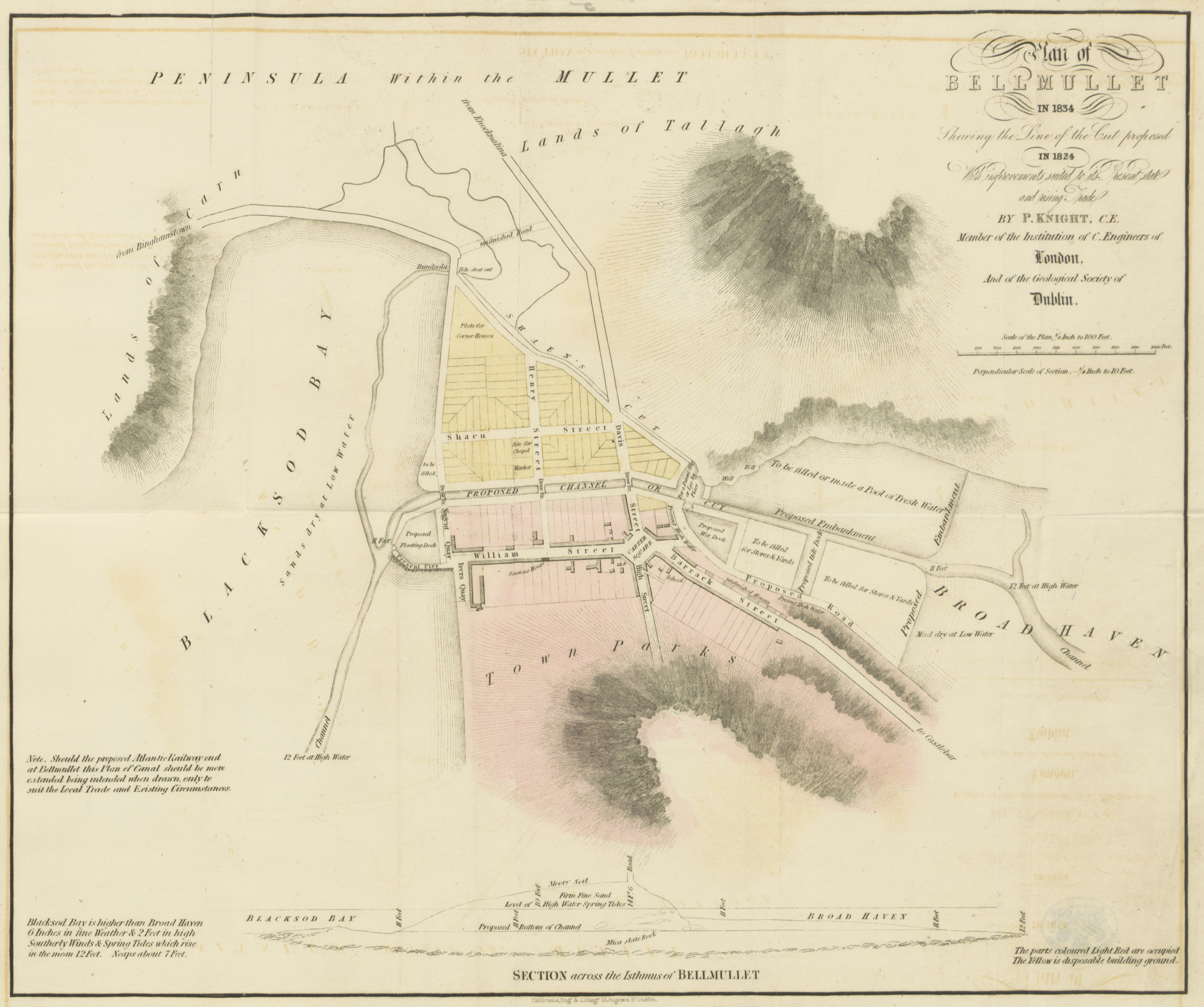
A map of Belmullet town from 1836

By 1831, the population of Belmullet was 585. A Roman Catholic chapel was built in 1832 at the cost of £300. There was a daily postal service between Ballina and Belmullet. In 1833, a courthouse was built also costing £300 which held weekly court sessions, demonstrating that the town was rapidly growing. In the 1830s, a visitor described it as "the youngest town in Ireland and like all young things it is comparatively fresh and fair. The town itself contains a few thatched cabins but consists of small streets of moderately sized slated houses branching from a little square, or market place; the shops looked to be well furnished with not only necessaries but articles conducive to comfort and convenience. Buildings are going on and speculation is progressing." He also commented that the approach to the town was "spoiled by deformed, wretched bog huts." Two new roads were built – one to the east went to Ballycastle and one to the south to Newport. The export of meal from the area to England started. The local Protestant Church was built in 1843. In 1845, work began to re-open the canal which had been constructed by Arthur Shaen. Because of the Irish Famine, the canal was not completed until 1851. During the Relief work for the Distress (in the middle of the Great Famine) in 1846 and 1847, the footpaths were formed and flagged.

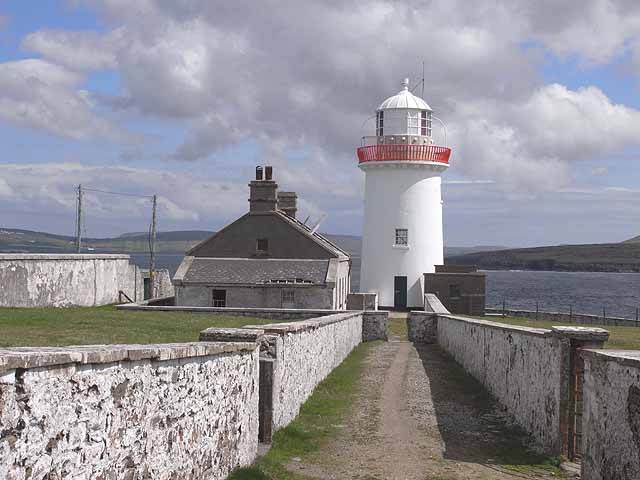
Ballyglass Lighthouse, also known as Broadhaven Lighthouse, 11 km from Belmullet town, was built in 1848

In the latter half of the 19th century rural unrest was a common occurrence across Mayo. In November 1881, over 100 police officers needed in order to protect two process servers who were serving writs in the town. The police were confronted by an angry crowd throwing rocks and sticks. The police were obliged to charge the crowd and fire buckshot resulting in a large number of injuries. The police made 20 arrests.

A workhouse was erected on the site of the current hospital. The Head of the Treasury, Charles Trevelyan, notoriously decreed that relief was only to be given to workhouse people. Starving people crowded to the workhouse. At one stage at the height of the Famine, 3,000 people were recorded as being in Belmullet workhouse. The area around Belmullet was severely impacted by the Great Irish Famine in the 19th century and in the next 100 years many people emigrated from the area to the United States and to England. Throughout the second half of the 19th century, many proposals were made regarding the development of a railway line in to Belmullet and Erris region. Three routes were surveyed and discussed:

- Route One: Ballina – Ballycastle – Belmullet
- Route Two: Newport – Mulrany – Belmullet
- Route Three: Ballina – Crossmolina – Belmullet

People along these routes lobbied for the railway lines to pass through their district. However the merchants of Belmullet were more skeptical and feared that the introduction of a railway line would adversely affect their trading position, putting Ballina within easy reach of the population. Plans for a Blacksod railway terminus, which would have served trans-Atlantic shipping, were therefore postponed. Many still pressed the authorities for a rail line, and this movement gained momentum during the latter days of the First World War, when it was proposed that a line would improve lines of communication between both London and Canada, and between London and the United States. However, when the war ended in 1918, the hopes for a railway service to Blacksod ended with it. In the early 1920, the Sligo Steam Navigation Company ran weekly sailings between Belmullet, Sligo and Liverpool.

In July 1865, two local men – Richard Barrett and James Hogan were found guilty of piracy. They were convicted of plundering the schooner Elizabeth McClure of Indian meal near the island of Iniskea. Both men were sentenced to five years hard labour.

Belmullet established a monthly cattle fair, and the town began to take trade from An Geatta Mór. The Bingham family fought back, but their village was more or less deserted by the cattle traders by the late 19th century.

=== Early 20th century ===
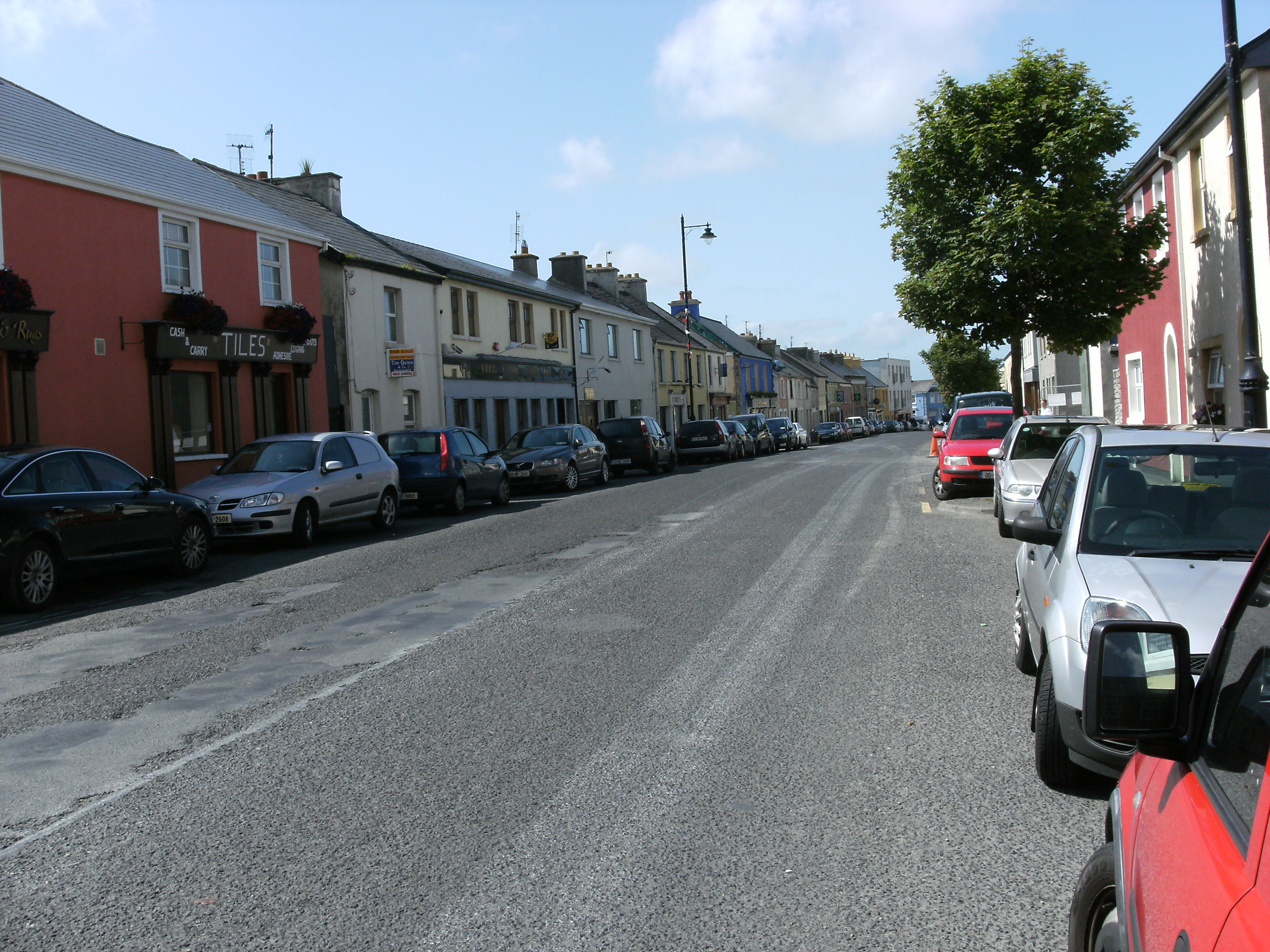
Upper Barrack Street (R313) in Belmullet town

John Millington Synge, author of The Playboy of the Western World and The Aran Islands, visited Belmullet in 1904, and reported: "Belmullet in the evening is noisy and squalid, lonely and crowded at the same time and without appeal to the imagination. So at least one stays for a moment. When one has passed six times up and down hearing a gramophone in one house, a fiddle in the next, then an accordion and a fragment of a traditional lullaby, with many crying babies, pigs and donkeys and noisy girls and young men jostling in the darkness, the effect is not indistinct. All the light comes from doors or windows of shops. Last night was St. John’s Eve and bonfires were lighted all over the country, the largest of all being placed at the Town Square at Belmullet. Today, again, there was a large market in the square, where a number of country people, with their horses and donkeys, stood about bargaining for young pigs, heather brooms, homespun flannels, second hand clothing, blackening brushes, tinker’s goods and many other articles".

=== Irish War of Independence ===
One of the two R.I.C. Policemen killed in the January 1919 Soloheadbeg ambush – Constable McDonnell – was born in Belmullet. The event triggered the War of Independence. Constable McDonnell was 50 at the time of his death. He left a widow and five children.

On 26 October 1919 a young boy was shot and wounded by a sentry guarding the local wireless station. The boy was driving cows near his home early in the morning, when he was shot in the shoulder. The incident caused great indignation among the local population.

In June 1920, an R.I.C. policeman was killed and three were injured during a riot on the main street of the town. The policemen intervened to arrest a man for causing a disturbance during a fair. The crowd attending the fair resented the intervention and turned on the police officers. The police retreated and took refuge in a house, One of the officers – Constable Doogue – was later discovered on the street with a wound to the head. When the doctor arrived, he was found to be dead.

In late August 1920, the local Coastguard station was attacked. The raiders were interrupted by a police patrol, and shots were exchanged. The raiders escaped but not before the station was destroyed.

During the latter stages of the conflict, a Republican Court was established in the town. In January 1921 Two Ballina Solicitors – P. J. Ruttledge and Henry Bourke – were arrested and charged by the British military authorities for participating in the court. Mr. Ruttledge declined to recognize the British court and was subsequently jailed in Castlebar.

A breach of the Anglo Irish Truce occurred in the Town in October 1921. Two Republican Policemen were quelling a row that broke out in the evening after the town's regular fair. The Republican policemen were attacked by six R.I.C. officers. The fighting escalated as more RIC and IRA men joined the affray. Later, shots were exchanged by the two sides.

=== Irish Civil War ===
During the early weeks of the Irish Civil War, Belmullet was under the control of Anti-Treaty forces. However, support for the Anti-Treaty cause was not universal. A prominent member of the North Mayo brigade of the IRA, Mr P. Kelly, was arrested by Anti-Treaty forces due to his perceived support of the government. Kelly was the assistant clerk of the Belmullet Union. In July 1922, the (Pro-Treaty) National Army entered County Mayo and established control over the county on behalf of the Free State government. However, Anti-Treaty activity continued in Belmullet for months after and, in September, Republican forces entered the town, took petrol and left. The National Army pursued them and arrested six men. In October 1922, Anti-Treaty soldiers established temporary control over the town. They stopped all traffic and raided all the banks in the town taking away a large sum of money. They also forced all the local public houses to pay a "Republican licensing fee". The mail van was also held up.

=== Second World War ===
On 6 August 1940, during the Second World War, Garda William Cullen of Belmullet station received a phone call from coast-watchers at the nearby Annagh Head lookout post. He learned that the Atlantic currents had washed ashore the body of a British soldier. From his army pay-book, Cullen identified 21-year-old Donald Domican of the 5th Battalion, the Welsh Regiment. On the evening of 6 August, Domican's body was brought to Belmullet hospital. He was buried the following day at the Church of Ireland cemetery in the town. The next day another body of a British soldier was washed up at the same site.

Weather reports from the Belmullet weather station and nearby Blacksod Lighthouse also played a role in Allied planning for the Normandy landings. In June 1944, weather observer Maureen Sweeney reported deteriorating conditions from Blacksod, contributing to the postponement of the invasion by 24 hours. Improved conditions reported from the area on 4 June helped confirm a favourable weather window for the landings. In June 2021, Sweeney was presented with a special honour from the United States House of Representatives at a ceremony in Belmullet in recognition of her role in the D-Day weather reports.

=== Post-War ===
In 1958, Belmullet became the site of a conflict between Erskine Childers, Minister of Lands, and local workmen who refused to construct a fence through an area thought to be occupied by fairies. The Government was unable to find other workers to build the fence, so finally relented and "bent" the fence around the disputed hill.

=== 21st century ===
In the early 21st century, improvement in the Irish economy has reversed population decline, and Belmullet has seen some immigration. Despite job losses in the area since the recession started in 2007, as with all over Ireland, Belmullet and the Mullet Peninsula has good natural resources in terms of fishing, tourism and small local industries are present such as Mayo Mats and the Corrib Gas terminal.

== Culture and tourism ==
Áras Inis Gluaire, located in Belmullet town

Although officially part of the Mayo Gaeltacht, it is both an English- and Irish-speaking town. The area plays host in summer months to students enrolled in local Irish language summer schools.

John Millington Synge's play The Playboy of the Western World was based on his experience of the Belmullet area. Synge also wrote a poem entitled "Danny" about a character who was murdered by a group of local men as he was on his way back into Belmullet from Bangor Erris.

The area is popular for fishing, with both fresh-water and sea-angling off Broadhaven Bay. Watersports are also common, with surfing, windsurfing, kitesurfing and sailing.

Belmullet is the nearest town to the Carne Golf Links, the last complete design from the Irish golf architect Eddie Hackett, sometimes listed in the top 100 golf courses in the world.

The Belmullet Tidal Pool is a popular swimming spot with both locals and toursits, and was listed as one of the 10 best seawater swimming pools in the UK and Europe by The Guardian.

This area of Erris was the setting for the Ulster Cycle legend of the Táin Bó Flidhais or the Mayo Táin.

In 2007, a new arts centre, Áras Inis Gluaire, opened in the town. Its mission was to become a leading bilingual arts centre in Ireland. As well as serving as the towns library and art gallery, the centre has a theatre, which has seen several notable artists perform in the town, among them Mick Flannery and Damien Dempsey.

Since being included on the Wild Atlantic Way, and after the wider Erris region was named 'Best Place to Go Wild in Ireland' by The Irish Times in 2014, the town has experienced an increase in tourism.

== Festivals ==
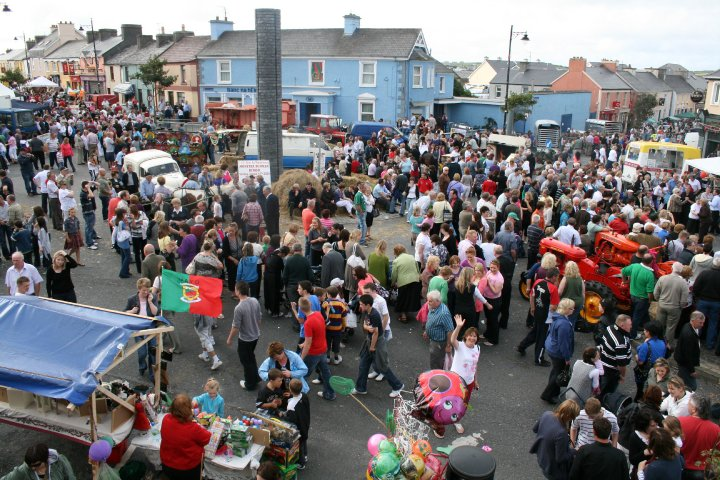
Belmullet town square on heritage day

Festivals in the area include Féile Iorras, an international arts festival which is held in the town for a period of about ten days each July. It was set up in 1996 by Mayo County Council arts office to promote understanding and integration between the people of Erris and communities throughout the world. The festival encompasses all forms of folk art from dancing to visual arts to music. Many of the pubs in Belmullet participate.

Lá an Logha, held annually on 15 August (also known as "ladies day"), is one of the busiest periods of the year in the town. This festival started off as a farmer's market and a day for men to propose to their future wives and parade through the town with her on this specific day.

Féile na Seachtaine, another arts based festival, follows Lá an Logha. The town's annual heritage day is held during this time and people who have emigrated from Erris return to the area during the month of August.

== Climate ==
Climate data for Belmullet (1991–2020 normals, extremes 1956-present)
Month	Jan	Feb	Mar	Apr	May	Jun	Jul	Aug	Sep	Oct	Nov	Dec	Year
Record high °C (°F)	13.9 (57.0)	15.6 (60.1)	22.2 (72.0)	24.4 (75.9)	28.7 (83.7)	28.3 (82.9)	29.9 (85.8)	27.7 (81.9)	26.2 (79.2)	22.1 (71.8)	16.3 (61.3)	14.9 (58.8)	29.9 (85.8)
Mean daily maximum °C (°F)	8.9 (48.0)	9.2 (48.6)	10.5 (50.9)	12.2 (54.0)	14.6 (58.3)	16.3 (61.3)	17.6 (63.7)	17.7 (63.9)	16.5 (61.7)	13.8 (56.8)	11.0 (51.8)	9.2 (48.6)	13.1 (55.6)
Daily mean °C (°F)	6.4 (43.5)	6.5 (43.7)	7.7 (45.9)	9.1 (48.4)	11.4 (52.5)	13.5 (56.3)	14.9 (58.8)	15.0 (59.0)	13.7 (56.7)	11.2 (52.2)	8.7 (47.7)	6.9 (44.4)	10.4 (50.7)
Mean daily minimum °C (°F)	3.9 (39.0)	3.9 (39.0)	4.9 (40.8)	6.0 (42.8)	8.2 (46.8)	10.6 (51.1)	12.3 (54.1)	12.4 (54.3)	11.0 (51.8)	8.7 (47.7)	6.3 (43.3)	4.6 (40.3)	7.7 (45.9)
Record low °C (°F)	−8.1 (17.4)	−6.3 (20.7)	−5.7 (21.7)	−2.6 (27.3)	−0.4 (31.3)	1.4 (34.5)	5.1 (41.2)	3.1 (37.6)	0.8 (33.4)	−1.7 (28.9)	−4.5 (23.9)	−7.6 (18.3)	−8.1 (17.4)
Average precipitation mm (inches)	136.9 (5.39)	109.9 (4.33)	90.6 (3.57)	74.0 (2.91)	70.8 (2.79)	73.0 (2.87)	85.9 (3.38)	100.5 (3.96)	102.6 (4.04)	131.2 (5.17)	139.6 (5.50)	126.6 (4.98)	1,241.6 (48.88)
Average precipitation days (≥ 1.0 mm)	20.1	17.8	16.7	13.8	13.2	12.4	14.9	15.8	15.8	18.7	21.0	20.7	200.9
Average relative humidity (%)	85.1	84.0	82.4	81.1	80.5	82.5	84.7	84.6	84.1	84.1	84.6	85.2	83.6
Average dew point °C (°F)	4.4 (39.9)	4.3 (39.7)	4.8 (40.6)	6.1 (43.0)	8.1 (46.6)	10.4 (50.7)	12.2 (54.0)	12.4 (54.3)	11.0 (51.8)	8.6 (47.5)	6.4 (43.5)	4.9 (40.8)	7.8 (46.0)
Mean monthly sunshine hours	44.8	69.0	108.2	159.4	195.2	167.7	136.8	143.0	118.8	91.9	49.7	36.1	1,320.6
Source 1: Met Éireann
Source 2: NOAA Servizio Meteorologico (extremes)

== Transport ==
Bus Éireann route 446 links Belmullet with Bangor Erris, Crossmolina and Ballina. There are four services a day in each direction on weekdays, and three on weekends. Route 460b links Belmullet with Bangor Erris, Newport and Castlebar, and has three services each way daily.

There is mooring for small boats at the docks on the northeastern side of the town,which can be accessed from Broadhaven Bay.

Belmullet Aerodrome, a small airfield with a single grass runway, is located 2 nautical miles (3.7 km; 2.3 mi) west of the town.

== Notable people ==
- Riocard Bairéad (Richard Barrett), poet
- Chris Barrett, Gaelic footballer
- Rose Conway-Walsh, politician
- Sinead Diver, long-distance runner
- Philip Gaughan, sergeant
- Róisín Heneghan, architect
- James Kilroy, politician
- Jimmy Monaghan, musician
- Patrick H. Monaghan, soldier
- Ronan Murray, footballer
- Ryan O'Donoghue, Gaelic footballer
- Willie Joe Padden, Gaelic footballer
- Billy Joe Padden, Gaelic footballer
- Mary Reilly, academic

== See also ==
- Belmullet GAA
- Connacht Irish
- Kilcommon
- List of towns and villages in Ireland
