= KXCI =

- Tucson, Arizona; United States
- Broadcast area: Tucson metropolitan area
- Frequency: 91.3 MHz (HD Radio)
- Branding: 91.3 KXCI

Programming
- Format: Free-form/community radio

Ownership
- Owner: Foundation For Creative Broadcasting

History
- First air date: November 19, 1983
- Call sign meaning: "XCI" is 91 in Roman numerals

Technical information
- Licensing authority: FCC
- Facility ID: 22167
- Class: C2
- ERP: 18,000 watts
- HAAT: 1,110 meters (3,640 ft)
- Transmitter coordinates: 32°0′11.8″N 110°47′51.1″W

Links
- Public license information: Public file; LMS
- Webcast: Listen Live
- Website: kxci.org

KXCI (91.3 FM) is a non-commercial radio station licensed to Tucson, Arizona, United States. It is owned by the non-profit Foundation for Creative Broadcasting, and carries a free-form/community format. Their studios and offices are located at 220 South 4th Avenue, Tucson, Arizona. Its transmitter is sited on East Mount Bigelow Road in Whitetail, Arizona.

Primarily a music station, KXCI also carries short-form features about local issues, as well as the syndicated political show Democracy Now! on weekdays. The station offers programs for Native Americans, the LGBTQ community and the Latino community. KXCI plays a variety of musical genres, featuring both independent artists and bands/musicians on major labels. They include Alternative Rock, Progressive country, Americana, Blues, Jazz, Latin jazz, Cumbia, Reggaeton, Punk rock, and Folk.

== History ==
In the late 1970s, Tucson residents Paul Bear, Frank Milan, and Roger Greer began preliminary work on the idea of a new, non-commercial radio station with a community-centered focus. They received a construction permit from the Federal Communications Commission (FCC) in November 1982 after completing FCC filings and a frequency search.

The original concept of finding a name for their call sign was to run a contest, and then see if the name was available. However, upon receiving a letter from the FCC regarding the need to select call letters, a volunteer came up with the name KXCI, and was the top choice out of five submitted to the FCC. Those calls were available and were assigned.

The station signed on the air on November 19, 1983. It began at 7 p.m. with a stunt format, playing reggae music for two days to promote a station benefit concert featuring Eek-A-Mouse. They then ran a three-week promotion called the "Big Broadcast of 1983", which featured a historical journey from earliest music to contemporary. It included a wide variety of genres and ended on December 5 with a live concert at the studio.

There was some controversy about the final format of the new station, including one that the station was going to play urban contemporary music 24/7, causing Top 40 station KHYT 1330 (now silent) to bill itself as "Tucson's First Rock and Soul Station". KHYT's promotion abruptly ended once the true format was known. It would be a 'music mix' during the day, and over 29 musical styles and genres during nights and weekends. The station still airs many genres and styles not generally found on other stations in the Tucson radio market.

The station was originally located at 91.7 FM. In the early 1990s, the station moved to its present 91.3 frequency to permit the station formerly known as KFMA 92.1 (now KCMT) to raise its power and cover more of the Tucson area.

Former logo

== Specialty programming ==
Specialty shows on KXCI are mostly heard on weeknights and weekends. Its Monday night show, Locals Only!, which has been broadcasting since May 1998, features Tucson's musicians with interviews and live performances by the bands. KXCI is also a local carrier for Democracy Now!.

In 1995, Michael Metzger quoted the station's then board president Shirley Shade in a Tucson Weekly article that illustrates the station's diversity of musical offerings: "If you don't like something that you're hearing at this moment, just wait a minute and something different will be on," says Shirley Shade, president of the Foundation for Creative Broadcasting's board of directors. (The foundation is a non-profit corporation that holds KXCI's broadcast license and oversees the station's operation.) "It's a learning experience, it exposes you to different types of music that you might not normally listen to."

== Funding ==
KXCI is a non-profit organization that operates under the corporation name The Foundation for Creative Broadcasting, Inc. and is designated as a cultural entity, according to the Arizona Corporation Commission website.

Due to its non-profit status, and due to FCC and grant regulations, KXCI does not air traditional radio commercials. Instead, KXCI's DJs read underwriters' spots that highlight the underwriters' businesses or events. The disc jockeys also share public service announcements featuring Tucson's local non-profits and their initiatives or events.

== Local media collaborations ==
In September 2015, the City of Tucson awarded KXCI, Brink Media, and Wavelab Studios a "contract to operate Tucson's new Community Media Center, officially replacing the now-defunct Access Tucson and City Channel," according to the Arizona Daily Star, which also wrote: "The partners will oversee public-access television broadcasting and local content designed to grow the economy, and provide training in media arts."

KXCI also collaborates with Tucson Weekly and Arizona Public Media's Jim Nintzel by airing the political journalist's show, Zona Politics, on Sundays from 5 p.m. to 5:30 p.m

KXCI has either won or been a runner-up in Tucson Weekly's "Best of Tucson" awards for over two decades.

== See also ==
- List of radio stations in Arizona
- List of community radio stations in the United States
