= Madra (album) =

2024 studio album by NewDad

Studio album by NewDad
- Released: 26 January 2024
- Genre: Shoegaze; indie pop
- Length: 41:37
- Label: Fair Youth; Atlantic
- Producer: Chris W Ryan

NewDad chronology
Banshee (2022)	Madra (2024)

Madra (stylised in all caps) is the debut studio album by Irish rock band NewDad, released on 26 January 2024 through Fair Youth and Atlantic Records. It was produced by Chris W Ryan and received positive reviews from critics. It was recorded over two weeks in March of 2023 in Rockfield Studios in Wales. It features additional production from music producer Happa, as well as the band's guitarist, Sean O'Dowd. The album was mixed by Alan Moulder and Caesar Edmunds and was mastered at Metropolis Studios by Matt Colton.

== Critical reception ==
Professional ratings
Aggregate scores
Source	Rating
Metacritic	74/100
Review scores
Source	Rating
DIY	2.5/5 stars
NME	4/5 stars
Record Collector	4/5 stars
Uncut	8/10

Madra received a score of 74 out of 100 on review aggregator Metacritic based on seven critics' reviews, indicating "generally favorable" reception. Uncut stated that "Newdad's first full-length shows them expanding on their indie-pop roots, adding extra gnarly, post-punk bite and more sophisticated textures to their updated mix of The Cure, Slowdive and Curve". John Earls of Record Collector wrote that "as singer, Dawson channels a quiet despair in the more vulnerable 'Nosebleed', but it's the defiant full-throated charge elsewhere that's likely to see NewDad emerge as festival favourites".

Reviewing the album for NME, Huw Baines felt that "while NewDad might not be as structurally inventive as the power-pop-indebted Hotline TNT or as heavy as the nu-gaze-leaning Fleshwater, they are perhaps more streamlined and together, which counts for plenty". DIY's Emma Swann called it "a shame that Madra is so back-loaded", writing that "no doubt these songs will triumph when performed live, but as a record, Madra isn't quite it".

== Track listing ==
Madra track listing
No.	Title	Length
1.	"Angel"	3:19
2.	"Sickly Sweet"	3:23
3.	"Where I Go"	3:45
4.	"Change My Mind"	3:49
5.	"In My Head"	3:39
6.	"Nosebleed"	3:27
7.	"Let Go"	4:13
8.	"Dream of Me"	3:22
9.	"Nightmares"	3:44
10.	"White Ribbons"	4:24
11.	"Madra"	4:32
Total length:		41:37

== Charts ==
Chart performance for Madra
Chart (2024)	Peak position
Hungarian Physical Albums (MAHASZ)	13
Irish Albums (OCC)	6
Scottish Albums (OCC)	10
UK Albums (OCC)	77
