= An Taobh Tuathail =

Irish language alternative music program

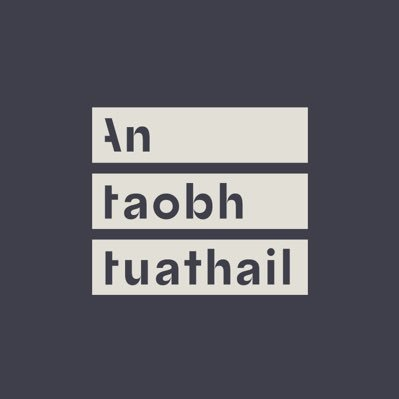
- Genre: post-rock, funk, soul, disco, house, techno, electronica
- Running time: 2 hours
- Language: Irish language
- Home station: RTÉ Raidió na Gaeltachta
- Produced by: Cian Ó Cíobháin
- Original release: May 1999 – present
- Website: An Taobh Tuahtail on RTE

An Taobh Tuathail is an Irish language alternative music program broadcast on RTÉ Raidió na Gaeltachta. It has been produced and presented by Cian Ó Cíobháin since its inception in 1999.

== History ==
Ó Cíobháin, originally from Country Kerry, started broadcasting An Taobh Tuathail from RTÉ Raidió na Gaeltachta's headquarters in Casla in 1999. The name An Taobh Tuathail translates to English as 'The Other Side', and Ó Cíobháin, who had worked as a music journalist for the publication Fionse, often used this term when describing B-sides. RTE Rnag previously only allowed Irish language and instrumental music on the station, but that rule was changed in 2005 thanks to the then Minister for the Arts Culture and The Gaeltacht Michael D Higgins, allowing An Taobh Tuathail to broadcast songs sung in other languages. Cian Ó Cíobháin has released several compilation albums of music featured on the show. It won a bronze accolade at the 2014 IMRO Radio Awards, in the category of Specialist Music Programme. On 3 May 2019, An Taobh Tuathail celebrated its 20th anniversary with a live show from Galway's Roisin Dubh music venue.

== Reception ==
In the book Made in Ireland: Studies in Popular Music, An Taobh Tuahtail was described as having "achieved cult status among enthusiasts of underground music culture". Writing for the Galway Advertiser, arts journalist Kernan Andrews stated: "Since it first began in 1999, the show has become essential listening for anyone who wants to keep abreast of underground and innovative trends in rock, dance, electronic, and world music." The show has been described as an "astoundingly cool late-night show" in the Irish Independent.
