= GoldenPlec =

Irish music magazine and website

- Website type: Private
- Headquarters: Dublin, Ireland
- Products: Magazine
- Website: www.goldenplec.com
- Launched: 2003

GoldenPlec is an Irish music magazine and website.

== History ==
Launched in 2003, GoldenPlec publishes music reviews, interviews, and news mainly related to the Irish independent music industry. It has been mentioned and noted on websites such as The Guardian, and the Irish Independent. In 2011 it was named best music site at the Irish Web Awards. In 2013, GoldenPlec won the Arthur Guinness Fund for music in Ireland. In 2015, twelve years after launcing as a website, Goldenplec began its print edition. The magazine partners with the Irish Music Rights Organisation to promote Irish music through its annual 'PlecPicks'.
