= R319 road (Ireland) =

Regional road in Ireland

R319 road
- Bóthar R319
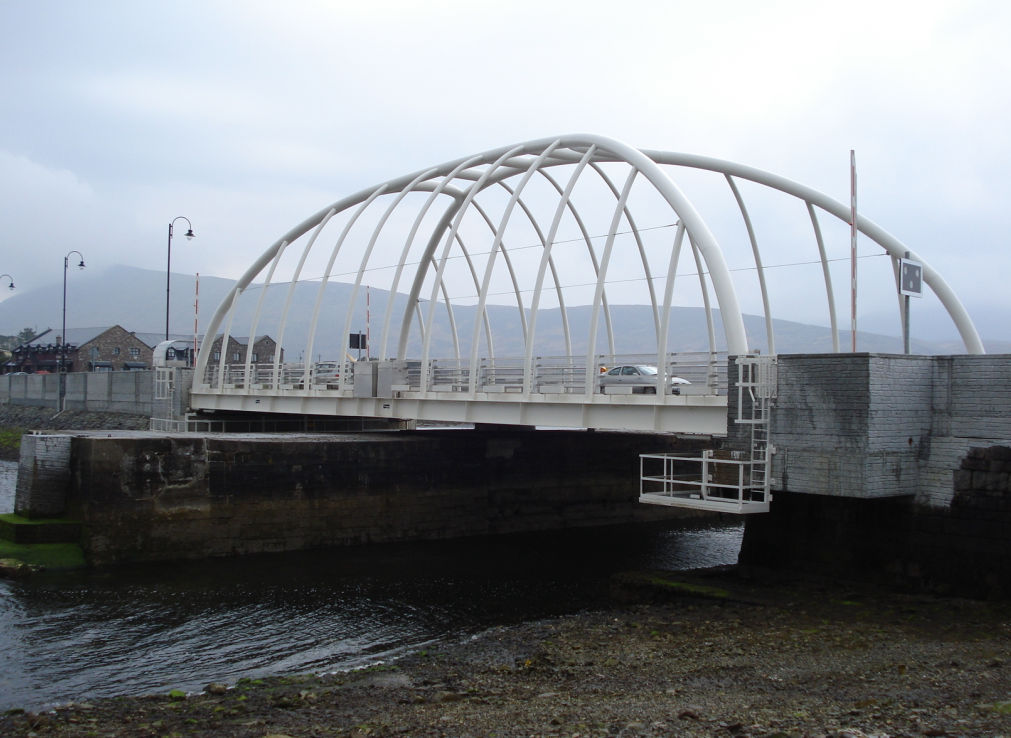
- The Michael Davitt Bridge on the R319 connects Achill Island to mainland County Mayo.

Route information
- Length: 35 km (22 mi)

Location
- Country: Ireland
- Primary destinations: County Mayo; Mulranny (N59); Achill Sound; Keel; Dooagh; Keem Strand

Highway system
- Roads in Ireland; Motorways; Primary; Secondary; Regional

The R319 road is a regional road in County Mayo, Ireland. It is the main road to Achill Island from the rest of the country.

== Route ==
The road is the main route onto Achill Island from the mainland (via the Michael Davitt Bridge) and connects the N59 at Mulranny (a national secondary road to the rest of Ireland) via Keel and Dooagh to Keem Strand on the island, 35 kilometres (22 mi) away.

The first part of the route follows the Great Western Greenway, a former railway line extension from Westport towards Achill. It gets gradually narrower and windier as it approaches Keem Strand, ending with a series of hairpin bends before a car park next to the beach.

The first bridge over the Achill Sound was constructed in 1887. It was rebuilt in 1947 and again in 2008, the latter costing €5 million.

The road is part of the Atlantic Drive on Achill Island, and popular with holidaymakers. The remainder of the Atlantic Drive route around Achill is signposted onto local roads where they follow the coastline more closely.

== Maintenance ==
The road is narrow and uneven in places, and below the standard required for modern road traffic. In April 2017, the bridge between Mulranny and Tonragee was reduced to one lane of traffic as it had become unstable. Repairs were carried out throughout the year. A local councillor complained that the works were not considered important by the Department for Transport as it was only a regional road, as opposed to the nearby N59. In 2019, a local group petitioned the Department of Transport and Mayo County Council to urgently improve three bridges along the R319.

In 2023, the local council complained again about a lack of investment on the road. One councillor said it had "more humps and hollows than a camel’s back", explaining around €3 million was needed to bring the road up to acceptable safety standards.
