= Pollagh (Achill) =

Pollagh An Pollach
- Village
- Location in Ireland
- Coordinates: 53°58′22″N 10°06′26″W
- Country: Ireland
- Province: Connacht
- County: County Mayo
- Irish Grid Reference: F 61763 04631

Pollagh (Irish: An Pollach) is a village on Achill Island off the coast of County Mayo. It is surrounded by the villages of Keel, County Mayo and Dooagh.

== Controversy ==
In November 2019, Pollagh became the scene of controversy after local people began a three month-long 24/7 protest to prevent refugees being accommodated in the Achill Head Hotel in the village. Because of the protest, the Department of Justice, which is responsible for refugees in the direct provision system, decided that staying in Pollagh was not in the best interests of the vulnerable female refugees concerned. Protesters insisted their motivation wasn't racist, a stance that was met with skepticism from some quarters. The protest petered out after two weeks.

Following the invasion of Ukraine by Russia in 2022, the Achill Head Hotel was used to accommodate both male and female refugees from Ukraine. No objections were raised by locals, and Ukrainians remained living in the village for several years.
