= Achill Sound =

Village in County Mayo, Ireland

Gob an Choire Achill Sound
- Village
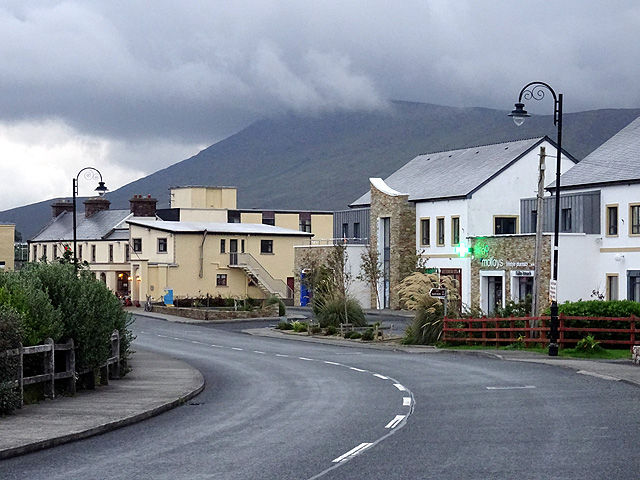
- Achill Sound on the R319 road

- Location in Ireland
- Coordinates: 53°55′40″N 9°56′21″W
- Country: Ireland
- Province: Connacht
- County: County Mayo

Population (2022)
  - Total: 265
- Irish Grid Reference: L731997
- As this is a Gaeltacht village, the Irish Gob an Choire is the only official name. The English name Achill Sound has no official standing.

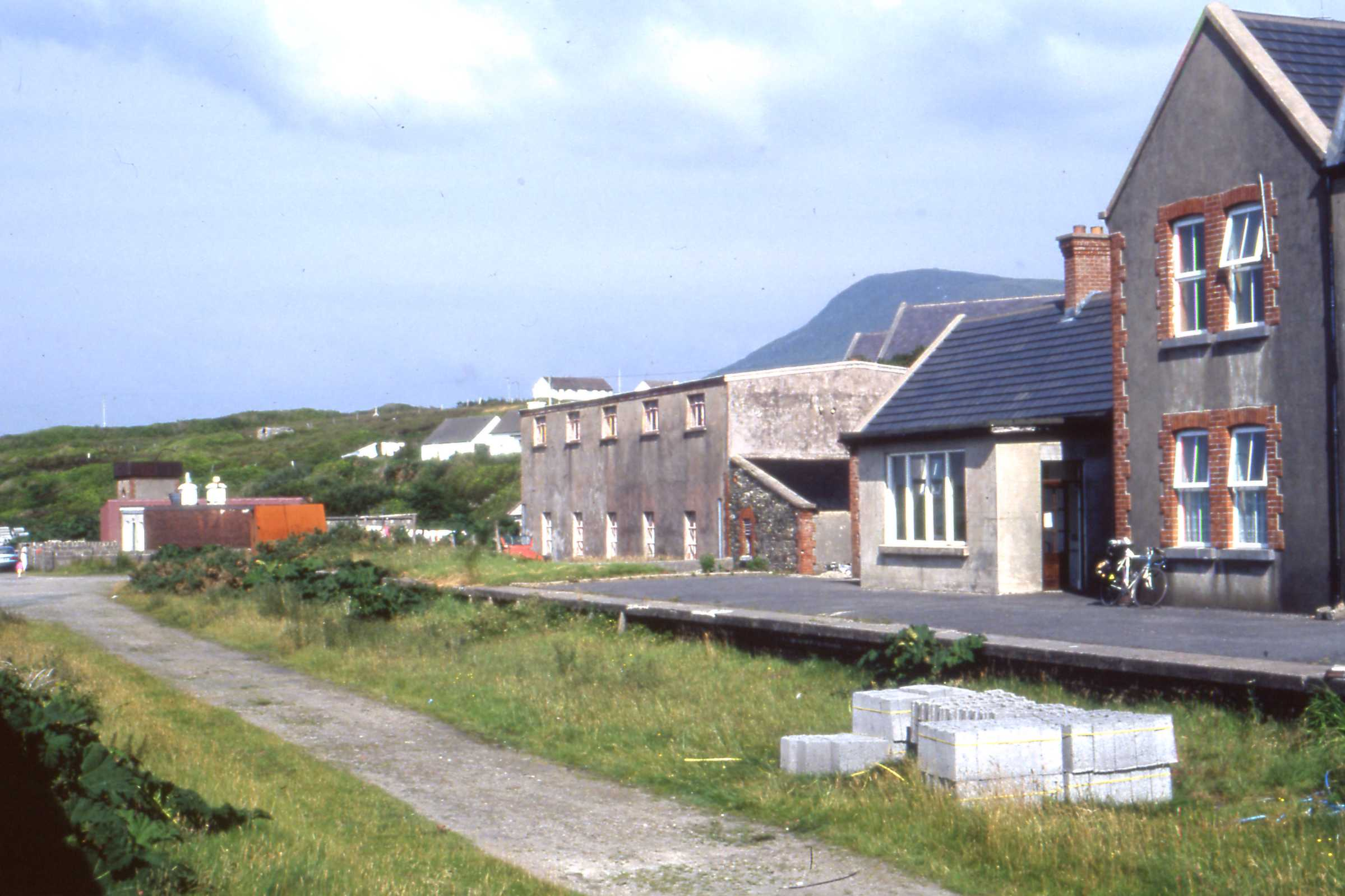
Old railway terminus which closed in 1937

Gob an Choire or Gob a' Choire (English name: Achill Sound), formerly anglicised as Gubacurra, is a Gaeltacht village in County Mayo, Ireland. It had a population of 265 at the 2022 census.

== Geography ==
The village of Achill Sound lies on the east coast of Achill Island and is the first settlement one reaches after crossing the Michael Davitt Bridge, which is a swing bridge that joins Achill Island to Corraun Peninsula on the mainland.

In ancient times the southern entrance was guarded by Carrickkildavnet Castle.

Achill Sound is also the name of the waterway separating Achill Island from the Irish mainland.

== Education ==
The local national (primary) school is Achill Sound National School. As of 2025, the school had an enrollment of 14 pupils.

== Transport ==
Achill Sound is located on the R319 regional road.

Bus Éireann route 450 (Dooagh-Westport-Louisburgh) operates several times a day in each direction, less often on Sundays.
