= Cruachan =

Cruachan may refer to:

== Ireland ==
- Cruachan, Ireland, the ancient capital of the kingdom of Connachta in Ireland
- Croaghaun, a mountain on Achill island, County Mayo (Irish name: Cruachán)
- Cruachan (band), an Irish folk metal band

== Scotland ==
- Ben Cruachan, a Scottish mountain
  - Cruachan Dam, a hydropower station at Ben Cruachan
- Cruachan, the name of a Shetland pony as mascot of the Argyll and Sutherland Highlanders (now of the Royal Regiment of Scotland)
- Cruachan! is the battle cry of the Highland clans Campbell and MacIntyre
