= An Caol =

An Caol, from the Irish and Scottish Gaelic for narrow, may refer to:

- Caol (Scottish Gaelic: An Caol), a village in Scotland
- Keel, County Mayo (Irish: An Caol), a town in Ireland
