= Eva O'Flaherty =

Irish nationalist, Parisienne model, patron of the arts and London milliner

- Born: Eva O’Flaherty; 31 March 1874; County Galway, Ireland
- Died: 17 April 1963 (aged 89)
- Known for: Activist, arts patron, milliner

Eva O'Flaherty (31 March 1874 – 17 April 1963) was an Irish nationalist, Parisienne model, patron of the arts and London milliner who founded a successful knitting industry on Achill Island.

== Early life ==
O'Flaherty was born to Martin O'Flaherty and Mary Frances Barbara O'Gorman Lalor O'Gorman, strongly nationalist Catholics, in Caherlistrane's Lisdonagh House, County Galway.

Her father was involved in the John Mitchel Treason Felony trial in 1848, for the defence. Her mother was the daughter of Daniel O'Connell's colleague, Richard O'Gorman. Her uncle Richard was a Young Irelander and her granduncle was Purcell O'Gorman, O'Connell's 'second' for the 1815 duel with John D'Esterre, in which the latter was killed.

In her youth, O'Flaherty lived in Limerick but her secondary schooling was in Mount Anville Secondary School and Alexandra College. When she had finished school O'Flaherty went to Paris to study millinery. It was there she met and made friends with Constance Markievicz. She then opened a millinery shop in London.

== Nationalism and Achill ==
In 1910 O'Flaherty moved to Achill where she opened St Colman’s Knitting Industries. These were based in Dooagh and provided local employment for women of the area for fifty years. She also was part of the founding of Scoil Acla, with Darrell Figgis, Colm O’Loughlainn, and Anita McMahon. Unlike other founders of Scoil Acla, O'Flaherty stayed living on the island the rest of her life. Figgis was leader of the Irish Volunteers in Achill in April 1916. She was connected to other well-known members of Ireland's nationalist movement. By 1914, O'Flaherty was a member of Cumann na mBan with Louise Gavan Duffy. During the Easter Rising she was part of the group known as "basket women" carrying messages through the city by bicycle. She remained friends with many of her nationalist acquaintances for the rest of her life.

After the rising O'Flaherty returned to Achill. Her life in Paris and London, where for a time she had had a millinery shop, meant she had made a significant number of connections in artistic circles. As a result, people like the artists Paul Henry and Marie Howet and the writers Heinrich Böll and Graham Greene would visit her often.

O'Flaherty died on 17 April 1963 aged 89. President Éamon de Valera sent Senator Mark Killilea to give the oration. She was buried in Donaghpatrick graveyard, her coffin draped with a tricolour and given military honours. Her biography was written in 2012 by Mary J. Murphy. A portrait of O'Flaherty created in 1947 Derek Hill is part of the Hugh Lane collection.
