= Achill oysters =

Brand of edible oyster

Achill Oysters is a brand of edible oyster that is produced by the O'Malley family on Achill Island, County Mayo, Ireland. The Euro-Toques Food Award for aquaculture was awarded to Achill Oysters in 2016.
