= Carrickkildavnet Castle =

Ruined tower house, County Mayo, Ireland

- Caisleán Ghráinne (Irish)
- Kildavnet Castle/Tower; Grace O'Malley's Castle; Kildownet Tower
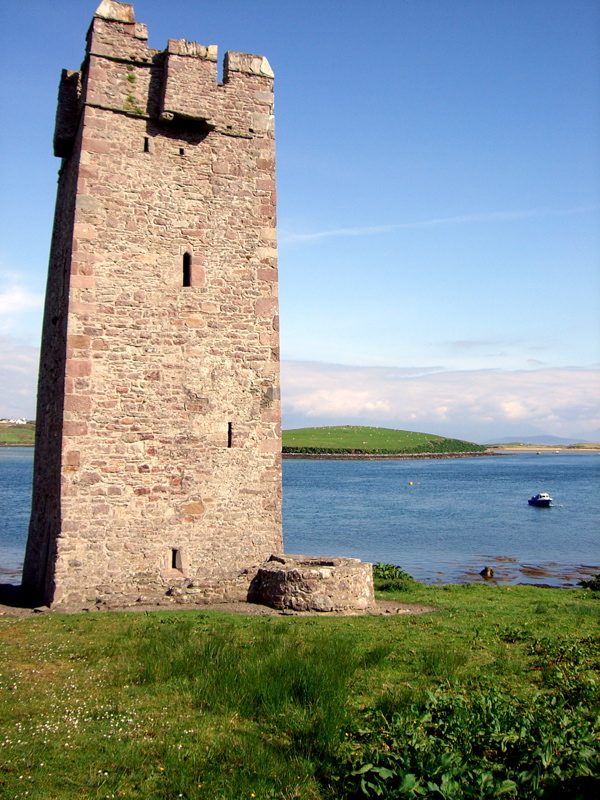

- Location within Ireland
- 53.880875°N 9.945935°W
- Type: tower house
- Location: Carrickkildavnet, Achill Island, County Mayo, Ireland

History
- Built: c. 1429

Site notes
- Height: 12 m (39 ft)
- Owner: State

National monument of Ireland
- Official name: Carrickkildavnet Castle
- Reference no.: 458

Carrickkildavnet Castle or Kildavnet Castle is a tower house and National Monument located in Achill Island, Ireland.

== Location ==
Carrickkildavnet Castle is located in the southeast corner of Achill Island, across from the Corraun Peninsula. This is an important strategic site, protecting the mouth of Achill Sound and the passage that connects Clew Bay with Blacksod Bay.

== History ==
Carrickkildavnet Castle was built c. 1429 by the Ó Máille (O'Malley), Kings of Umaill. It was later the stronghold of Gráinne Ní Mháille (Grace O'Malley, c. 1530 – c. 1603), the famous "pirate queen." Her other strongholds were at Rockfleet Castle (on Clew Bay) and Clare Island.

== Building ==
It is a tower house of four storeys' height. It is vaulted above the first floor and a hole at the corner of this vault is the only access to the higher levels, presumably for defensive reasons. Other defensive features include a mural chamber, machicolation, defensive loops, buttress fortifications at the top and a ruined bawn wall.

== Gallery ==
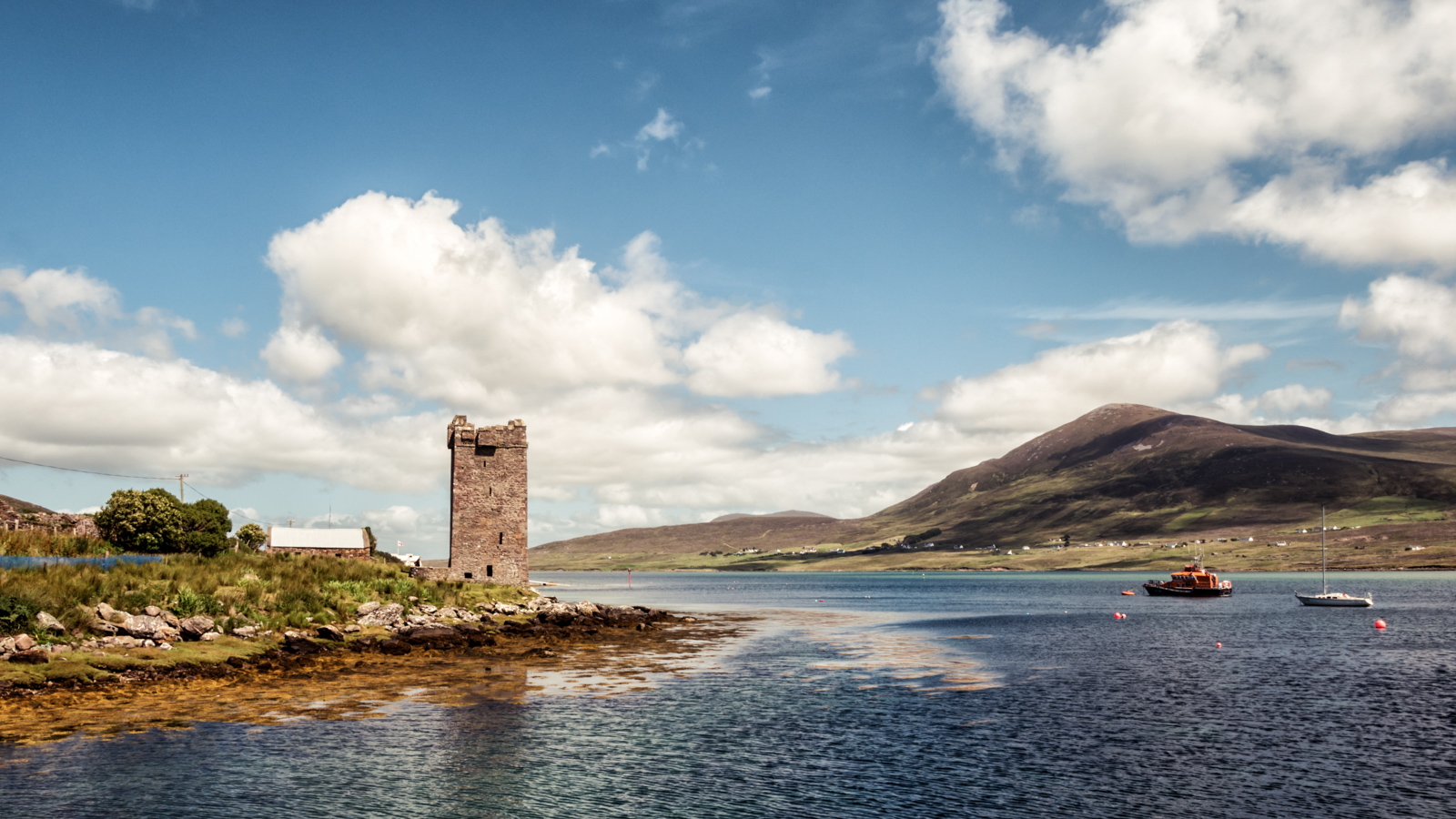
Landscape shot

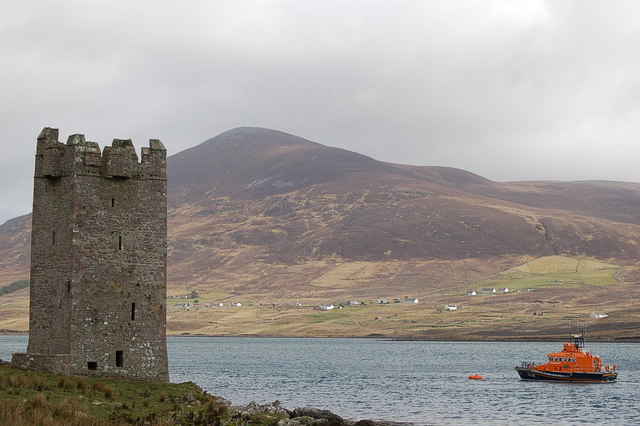
Castle with Achill Sound and Corraun Hill beyond

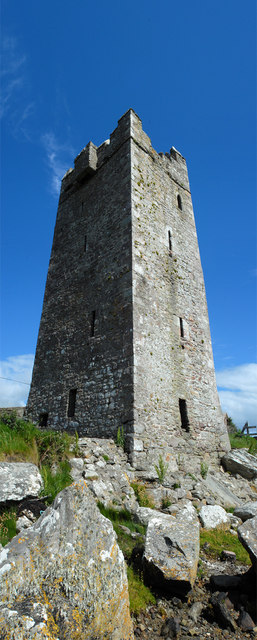
View of the tower house
