= Achill Island =

Island in County Mayo, Ireland

Achill
Native name: Acaill, Oileán Acla
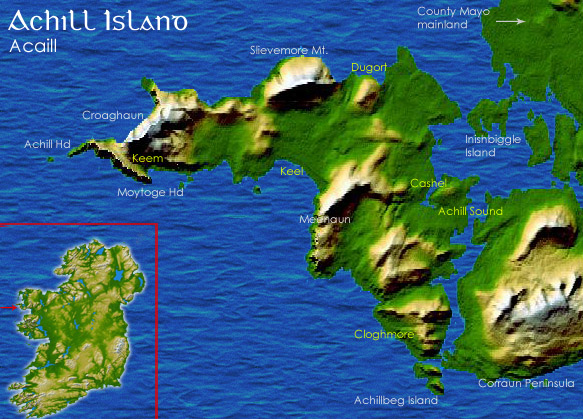
- Topography of Achill

- Location within island of Ireland

Geography
- Location: Atlantic Ocean
- Coordinates: 53.964°N 10.003°W
- Archipelago: Achill
- Total islands: 3 (Achill, Innisbiggle and Achillbeg islands)
- Major islands: Achill
- Area: 36,572 acres (14,800 ha)
- Coastline: 128 km (79.5 mi)
- Highest elevation: 688 m (2257 ft)
- Highest point: Croaghaun

Administration
- Ireland
- Province: Connacht
- County: Mayo
- Barony: Burrishoole

Demographics
- Population: 2,345 (2022)
- Pop. density: 17.3/km^{2} (44.8/sq mi)

Additional information
- Ireland's largest island

Achill Island (/ˈækəl/; Irish: Acaill, Oileán Acla) is located off the west coast of Ireland in the historical barony of Burrishoole, County Mayo. It is the largest of the Irish isles and has an area of approximately 148 km^{2} (57 sq mi). Achill had a population of 2,345 in the 2022 census. The island, which has been connected to the mainland by a bridge since 1887, is served by Michael Davitt Bridge, between the villages of Achill Sound and Polranny. Other centres of population include the villages of Keel, Dooagh, Dooega, Dooniver, and Dugort. There are a number of peat bogs on the island.

Roughly half of the island, including the villages of Achill Sound and Bun an Churraigh, are in the Gaeltacht (traditional Irish-speaking region) of Ireland, although the vast majority of the island's population speaks English as their daily language.

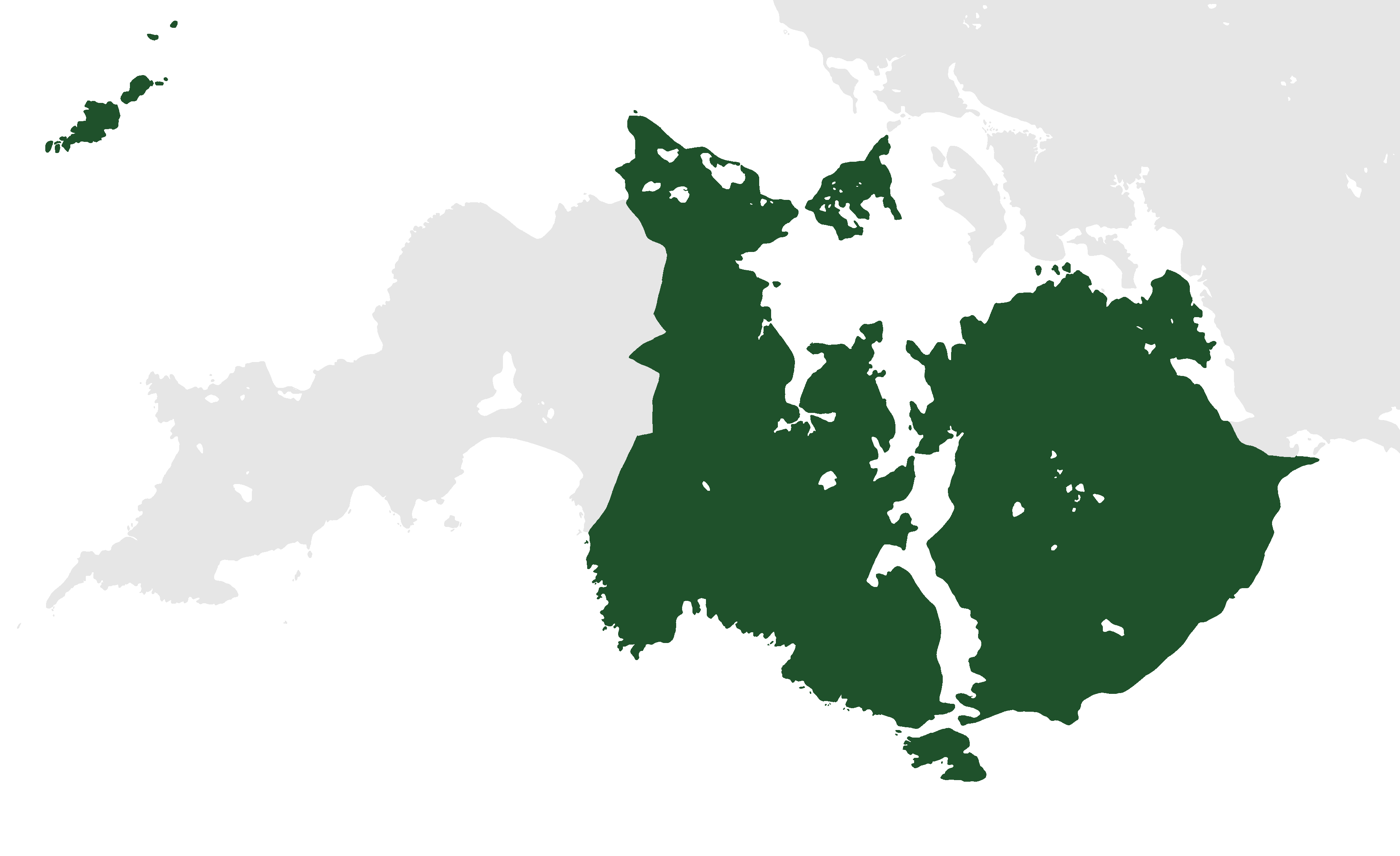
The Gaeltacht region of Achill and the Corraun peninsula, highlighted in green.

The island is within a civil parish, also called Achill, that includes Achillbeg, Inishbiggle and the Corraun Peninsula.

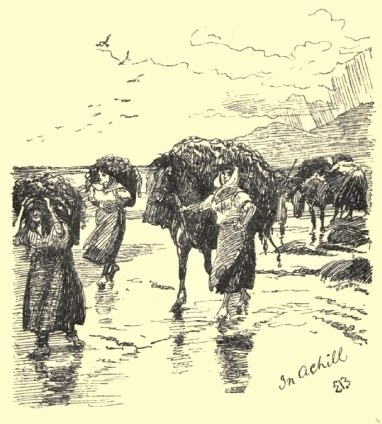
Our Escort into Glenaragh, from the sketch book and diary of Elizabeth Thompson

== History ==
=== Prehistory ===
Archaeological evidence indicates that Achill Island was occupied from at least the Neolithic period. During the Neolithic and Early Bronze Age, the island's climate was warmer and drier than today, dense woodland covered much of the landscape, and the extensive blanket bogs that now characterise Achill had not yet formed. Rather than being an isolated location, Achill may have occupied an important position on prehistoric maritime routes along Ireland's Atlantic coast. The remains of megalithic tombs and monuments suggest settlement by Neolithic people in the region of the 3rd or 4th millennium BC. It is believed that by the end of the Neolithic period, around 4000 BC, Achill had a population of 500 to 1,000 people, with the island mostly forested until Neolithic settlers began crop cultivation. The island preserves extensive evidence of this early landscape beneath its blanket bogs, including prehistoric field systems, preserved forests, shell middens and stone foundations on the slopes of Slievemore. Numerous pre-bog stone walls extend high up the mountainside, marking former agricultural land later engulfed by peat as the climate deteriorated during the Late Bronze Age. Achill contains six known megalithic tombs, including two court cairns and two portal tombs, though none has been excavated. Excavations on Slievemore have also revealed two large prehistoric roundhouses; the better studied of these, Roundhouse 1, has been radiocarbon dated to before 1411–1210 BC. Settlement increased during the Iron Age, and the dispersal of small promontory forts around the coast indicates the warlike nature of the period. Megalithic tombs and forts survive at Slievemore, along the Atlantic Drive and on Achillbeg.

=== Early medieval period ===
The early medieval period, from around the 5th century AD, saw considerable expansion in agriculture, particularly with the introduction of iron implements such as the plough. Evidence of early medieval artefacts has been reported at Keem Bay, Slievemore, Kildavnet and Achillbeg. The arrival of Christianity in Ireland around this time is reflected in two sites on the island. Kildamhnait, on the south-east coast, is named after Saint Damhnait, who is said to have founded a church there in the 7th century, and a holy well survives just outside the graveyard. At Slievemore, an early ecclesiastical site within the graveyard, possibly founded in the 7th century by Saint Colman, includes a holy well dedicated to the saint, although there is no evidence a church ever stood within the adjacent settlement. The present church at Kildamhnait was built in the 1700s, and its graveyard contains memorials to victims of two of Achill's later tragedies, the Kirkintilloch fire of 1937 and the Clew Bay Drowning of 1894.

=== Medieval overlordship ===
Achill Island lies within the historical barony of Burrishoole, in the territory of ancient Umhall (Umhall Uachtarach and Umhall Íochtarach), which originally extended from the County Galway/Mayo border to Achill Head. The hereditary chieftains of Umhall were the O'Malleys, recorded in the area in AD 814 when they repelled a Viking incursion into Clew Bay. The Anglo-Norman invasion of Connacht in 1235 saw the territory taken over first by the Butlers and later by the de Burgos, and the Butler lordship of Burrishoole continued into the late 14th century, when Thomas Le Boteller was recorded as holding Akkyll and Owyll. The Kingdom of Umhall was, at various points, also ruled by the Burkes, the O'Connors and the O'Donnells. The name O'Malley remains common on the island, and the clan's links to the area date to at least the 12th century.

==== Grace O'Malley ====
Carrickkildavnet Castle, a 15th-century tower house, is associated with the O'Malley clan, who were once a ruling family on Achill. Grace O'Malley, known as Granuaile, the most famous of the O'Malleys, was born on Clare Island around 1530, the daughter of the chieftain of the barony of Murrisk. Under her leadership, the O'Malleys controlled the waters of the western seaboard, imposing tolls on ships passing through their territory. The family traded widely, and Grace herself gained fame as a sea captain and pirate, reputedly meeting Queen Elizabeth I in 1593 before her death around 1603; she is buried in the O'Malley family tomb on Clare Island.

=== 17th and 18th centuries ===
Following the Cromwellian clearances of the 17th century, many native Irish families were dispersed from richer farmland in the north and east of Ireland into the remote west, and it is thought that several Ulster families sought refuge on Achill. The prevalence of Ulster surnames such as Gallagher, O'Donnell, Corrigan, Cafferkey and Mulloy on the island today supports this account. For a period, two distinct dialects of Irish were spoken on Achill, a situation reflected in several townlands being recorded under two different names in the 1824 Ordnance Survey. Achill Irish has been described as having an Ulster Irish superstratum layered over a northern Connacht Irish substratum.

By the 18th century, the Penal Laws, which barred Catholics from most areas of public life and from owning property, had produced widespread poverty and a reliance on the potato as the primary food crop. These conditions fostered a spirit of rebellion, and in 1798 an uprising led by Wolfe Tone saw around 1,100 French soldiers land in north Mayo in support of the insurgents, capturing towns including Newport and Castlebar. A priest with Achill connections, Fr Manus Sweeney, who had been educated in Paris, was seen speaking with a French officer, and after the rebellion was crushed he was imprisoned as a collaborator. He escaped custody and fled to Achill, but was captured after a manhunt and hanged on the main street in Newport; a memorial to him stands at the Dookinella end of Trawmore Strand on Achill.

=== 19th century ===
==== Achill Mission (1831–1880s) ====
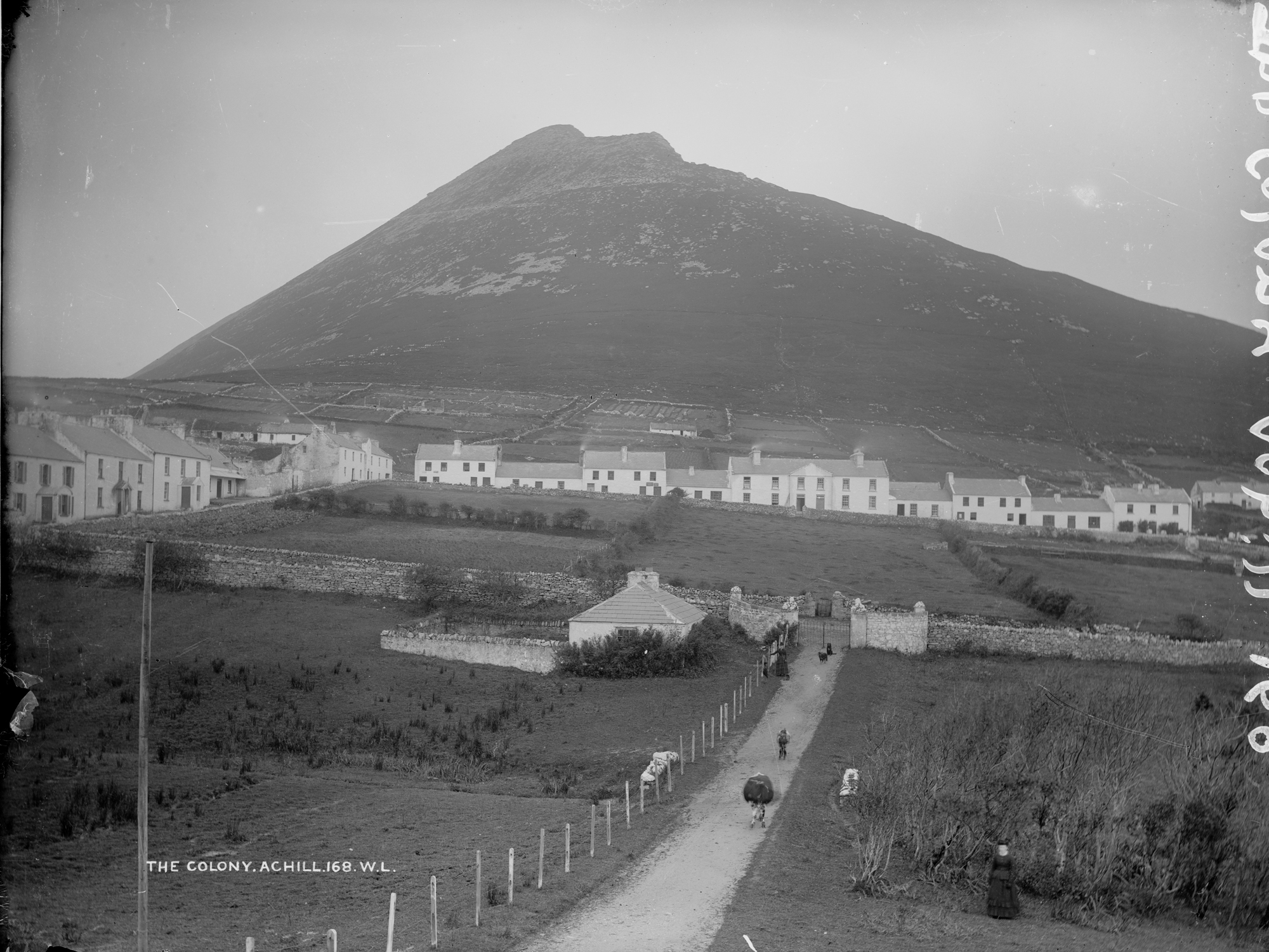
View of the "Colony", prior to 1900

The Achill Mission, also known as "the Colony," at Dugort, was founded in 1831 by the Anglican (Church of Ireland) minister Rev. Edward Nangle. Born in Dublin in 1800, Nangle was descended from the Nangle family, who had held the title of Barons of Navan for over 600 years, and was the first Protestant in his family line. He began his ministry as curate of Athboy, County Meath, before turning to missionary work, and sailed to Achill in 1831 aboard the relief ship Nottingham in response to famine conditions in the west of Ireland. Struck by the island's landscape and by what he perceived as the primitive condition of its people, Nangle resolved to found a Protestant colony there. The land, near Dugort at the base of Slievemore, was leased from the island's landlord, Sir Richard O'Donnell, and Nangle moved permanently to the completed colony in 1834 with his wife Eliza, his family and his most committed supporters. The mission included schools, cottages, an orphanage, an infirmary, a hotel and a printing press, and cultivated fields using contemporary agricultural methods. Notably, the mission preached to and taught islanders in Irish, and Nangle himself learned the language. Its principal publication, the Achill Missionary Herald and Western Witness, ran continuously from 1837 until 1868, when it merged with other missionary titles, and the colony's press also produced volumes on Protestant doctrine and an Irish-language dictionary. Relations between mission staff and islanders were initially cordial, but the arrival of the Catholic Archbishop of Tuam, John McHale, on the island in 1837 stirred opposition, and mission staff and supporters subsequently endured years of hostility, including beatings and intimidation, much of it recorded (with clear propaganda intent) in the Achill Herald. Despite this, the colony grew in prominence through the late 1830s and early 1840s, drawing visitors including the Arctic explorer Sir John Franklin and the travel writers Mr and Mrs S.C. Hall. Dr Neason Adams, a physician who gave up a lucrative Dublin practice to serve the island's poor without pay, was widely respected across religious divides for his humanitarian work.

==== Great Famine (1845-1849) ====
The Great Famine of 1845 to 1849 struck Achill particularly hard given the poor quality of its soil and near-total dependence on the potato. Nangle interpreted the famine as divine judgement on Ireland's sins, and the Colony gave rise to mixed assessments during this period, particularly as charges of "souperism" (providing food in exchange for religious conversion) were levelled against him. The provision of food alongside "scriptural" religious instruction across the mission's schools was especially controversial. As conditions worsened, Nangle abandoned strict conditions on aid, distributing relief more freely, though he still required able-bodied recipients to work. By the spring of 1847, the mission employed over 2,000 labourers and fed 600 children daily in its schools, and in July of that year an estimated 5,000 of Achill's roughly 7,000 people were receiving daily relief from the mission. In November 1848, a ship carrying 220 tons of Indian meal arrived from Philadelphia at the mission's expense, sufficient to feed 2,000 people. In 1848, at the height of the famine, the Achill Mission published a prospectus seeking funds to acquire further lands from Sir Richard O'Donnell, outlining its activities over the preceding decade and a half, including considerable sectarian unrest. Although Achill experienced serious hardship, its demographic decline was less severe than the national average, with population falling from 4,901 in 1841 to 4,075 in 1851, a reduction of around 16 per cent compared with a national decline of between 20 and 25 per cent. In 1850, the mission purchased three-fifths of the island from the O'Donnell estate, becoming Achill's effective landlord. In response, Archbishop McHale purchased land at Bunnacurry in 1852, on which a Franciscan monastery was established, providing education for local children for many years. Construction of the monastery was marked by conflict between the mission's supporters and the workers building it, an episode remembered in island folklore as the "Battle of the Stones". Eliza Nangle died in 1852 and was buried, along with six of the Nangle children who had died in infancy or childhood, on the slopes of Slievemore.

==== Decline and closure of Nangle Colony ====
In 1852, Nangle left Achill to become rector of Skreen, County Sligo, although he continued to spend part of each year on the island and remained the mission's nominal head. The colony's fortunes declined thereafter, weakened by successive land acts that undermined the mission's position as landlord, by the Land War of the 1870s and 1880s, and by a protracted and costly legal dispute between Nangle and a mission trustee, Joseph Napier, which, though eventually won by Nangle, left the mission effectively bankrupt. The Achill Mission closed in the 1880s, and Edward Nangle died in 1883, largely forgotten, having spent over fifty years on the project and having buried his first wife and ten of his children during his time on Achill. Assessments of his legacy remain divided, though the mission's contribution to the island's later infrastructure, including schools, churches and roads, is generally acknowledged.

==== Deserted Village ====
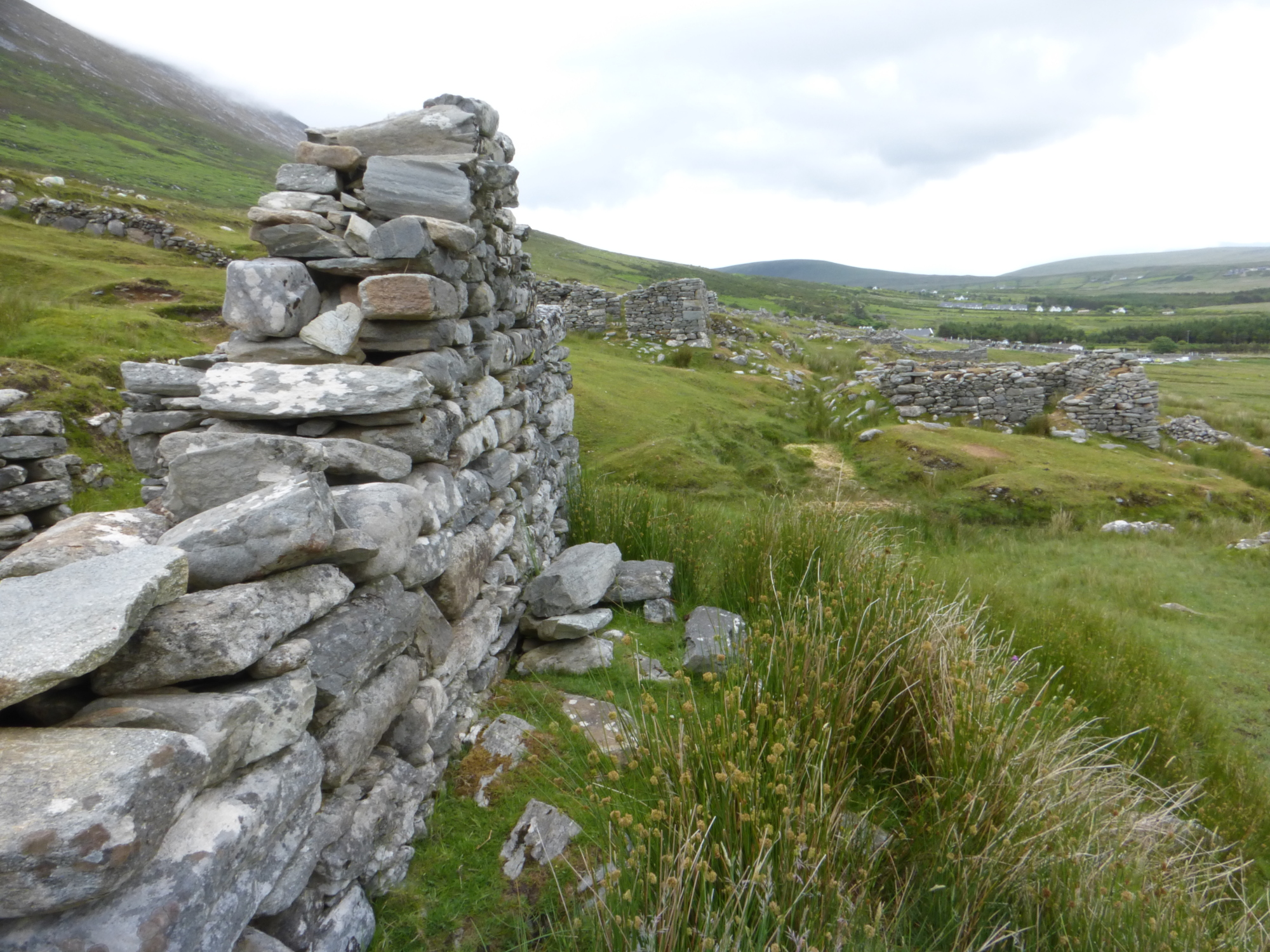
View of the deserted village from beside the ruins of one of the houses

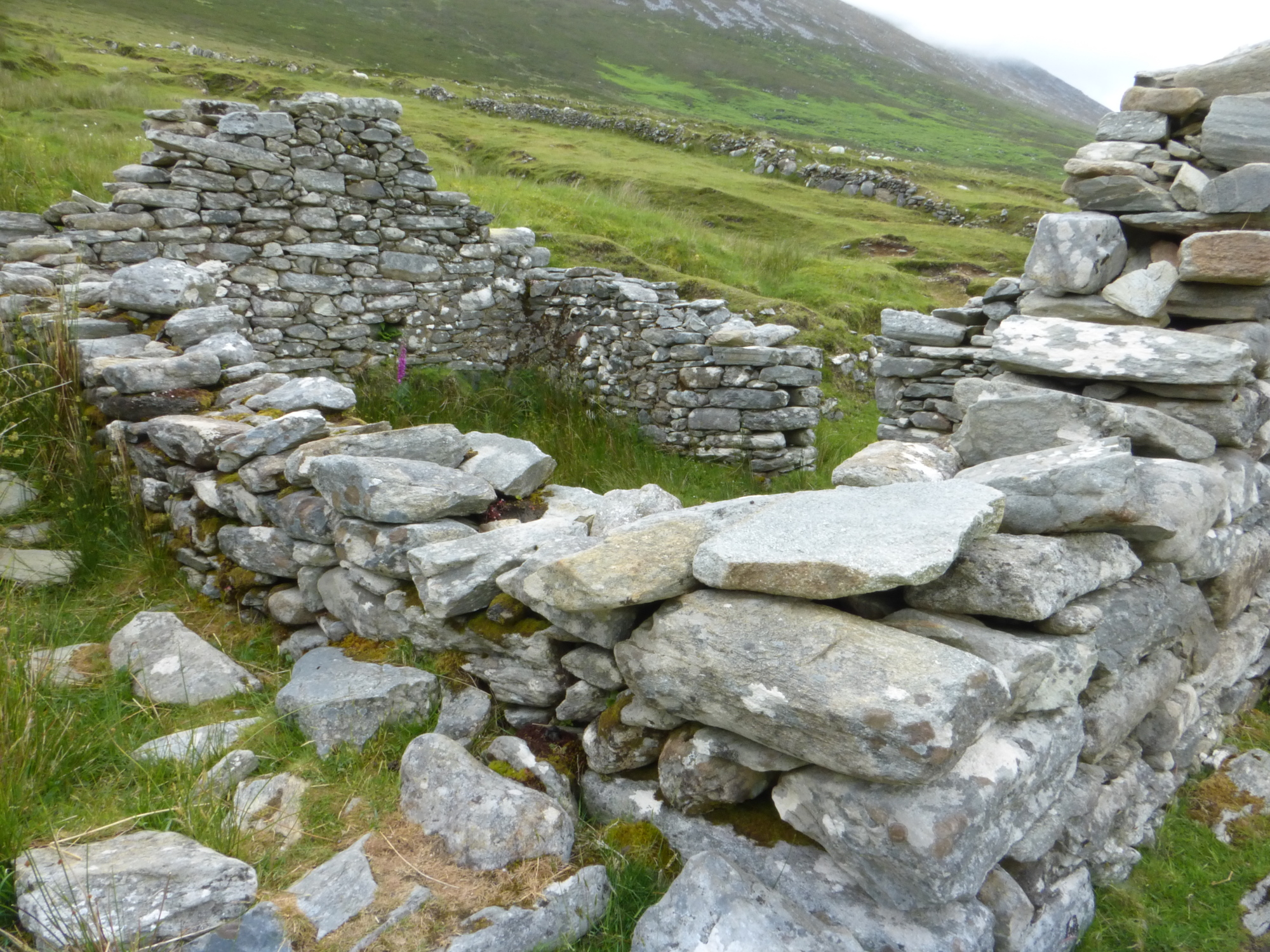
Inside the ruins of one of the houses at the deserted village

Close to Dugort, at the base of Slievemore, lies the Deserted Village, comprising between 80 and 100 ruined, unmortared stone houses of a single room each. Archaeological evidence suggests the settlement was established no earlier than around 1750, and it stretched for approximately 1.5 kilometres along the mountainside in three sections, known as Tuar, Tuar Riabhach and Faiche; it contained 137 houses as recorded by the Ordnance Survey in 1838, of which around 74 survive. Excavation has shown considerable variation in living standards between households, and finds of imported English and Scottish tableware indicate that residents purchased fashionable goods despite difficult economic conditions. The village operated under the "rundale" system, whereby land rented from a landlord was farmed in scattered strips by individual families and shared for grazing, with crops such as potatoes grown in "lazy beds". Livestock were managed through "booleying," or seasonal transhumance, with associated seasonal settlements identified at Annagh, Dirk, Keem Bay and Bunnowna.

The village was abandoned during the 1850s, a process accelerated but not caused solely by the Great Famine; contemporary mission records describe successive poor harvests, declining soil fertility and rising rents through the mid-19th century. Most families relocated to the nearby coastal village of Dooagh, where grants for fishing boats allowed them to take up fishing in place of farming, while others emigrated. Descendants of the households of the Deserted Village continued to use it as a seasonal "booley village" until the 1940s, making Achill the last known place in Ireland or Britain where this practice survived. A similar deserted settlement at Ailt, Kildownet, was abandoned in 1855 when tenants were evicted by the local landlord to make way for cattle grazing; those affected were forced to rent holdings in Currane, Dooega and Slievemore, or to emigrate to America.

==== Bridging the island ====
The idea of a bridge connecting Achill to the Corraun peninsula was first considered in the early 1880s; before this, islanders crossed the channel by ferry, a crossing made dangerous by strong currents, or on foot or horseback at low tide. Plans by the Mayo County Surveyor, Mr Glover, were approved by the Board of Trade in London, and an administrative body was established in 1883 to finance the project at a cost of £5,000. Construction began in 1886 and was completed the following year, and the bridge, connecting Achill Sound and Polranny, was named the Michael Davitt Bridge after the founder of the Irish Land League. The structure had deteriorated badly by the 1930s, as it had been built for horse-drawn rather than motor traffic, and Mayo County Council decided in 1939 to replace its middle section. The bridge was demolished in 1947, and reconstruction, delayed by poor weather, was completed in January 1949; the rebuilt manually operated swing bridge measures 21 feet 6 inches in width and 740 feet in length, and weighs 390 tonnes.

In 1894, the Westport-Newport railway line was extended to Achill Sound.

==== Clew Bay drowning (1894) ====
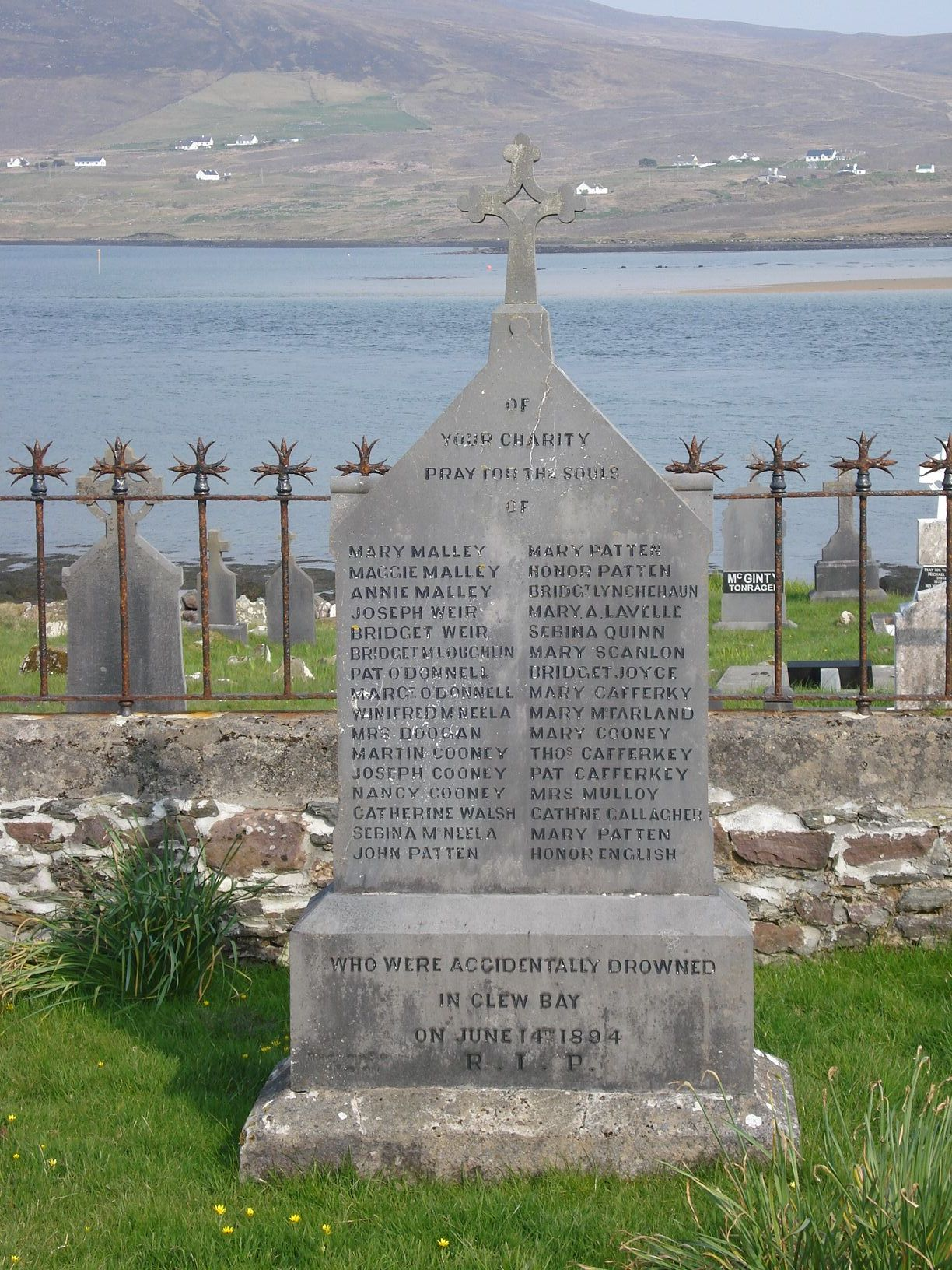
Memorial for the victims of the Clew Bay Drowning on 15 June 1894 at Kildavenet Graveyard

The first train on the newly opened railway line carried the bodies of the victims of the Clew Bay Drowning, in which thirty-two young people drowned when the boat carrying them to meet the steamer SS Elm for seasonal work in Britain capsized in Clew Bay.

==== Valley House attack (1894) ====
Agnes MacDonnell purchased the Valley House estate at Tonatanvally on Achill Island in 1888 and employed James Lynchehaun as her steward and bailiff. Their relationship quickly deteriorated into a bitter personal feud after his dismissal around 1890. Contemporary court evidence and later accounts suggested that Lynchehaun had become infatuated with MacDonnell, while she rejected his advances, although the precise nature of their relationship remains uncertain. Over the following years, MacDonnell repeatedly attempted to have Lynchehaun evicted from his nearby property, creating an increasingly hostile dispute that culminated in one of the most notorious criminal cases in nineteenth-century Ireland.

On the night of 6 to 7 October 1894, Valley House, its stables and outbuildings were deliberately set on fire. During the attack, MacDonnell was brutally assaulted, suffering severe facial injuries, including the loss of an eye and part of her nose. Lynchehaun was widely accepted to have been responsible, but after his arrest he escaped custody and remained hidden on Achill for several months, protected by local people who refused to inform on him despite a substantial reward. Recaptured in early 1895, he was tried at the Castlebar Assizes, convicted of wounding with intent to murder, and sentenced to penal servitude for life.

The case attracted national and international attention after Lynchehaun escaped from prison in 1902 and fled first to Scotland and then to the United States. There he portrayed himself as a victim of British oppression and gained support from Irish-American organisations, which opposed his extradition. Although his claim to political persecution was challenged by figures including Michael Davitt, American courts ultimately refused to extradite him under the terms of the 1842 extradition treaty between Britain and the United States, establishing an important legal precedent in American extradition law.

The affair entered Irish literary history through its influence on J. M. Synge's The Playboy of the Western World (1907). Synge acknowledged that the Lynchehaun case was one of the principal inspirations for the play, adapting the community's fascination with a notorious violent figure rather than the details of the crime itself. The connection was widely recognised at the play's premiere, with members of the audience reportedly shouting "Lynchehaun" during the opening-night disturbances, and the play even contains an allusion to the attack on MacDonnell's nose.

=== 20th century ===
==== Seasonal migration to Scotland ====
Through the 19th and 20th centuries, seasonal migration of farm workers from Achill to East Lothian for the potato harvest was common practice; these workers were known as "tattie howkers".

==== Kirkintilloch fire (1937) ====
On the night of 15 into 16 September 1937, ten migrant potato pickers from Achill, aged between thirteen and twenty-three and mostly related to one another, died in a fire at their accommodation in Kirkintilloch, Scotland. The group had been housed in a "bothy," a converted shed with a bolted sliding door and wire-covered windows, adjoining a cottage where the young women of the party stayed; like many seasonal workers, they had been locked in overnight to prevent so-called prowling. The alarm was raised by twelve-year-old Tom Duggan, who could not sleep and spotted the blaze, but the bodies of the ten victims, who were unable to escape through the high windows, were found huddled together beside a wall opposite the door. The tragedy was seen locally as fulfilling part of a 17th-century prophecy attributed to Brian Rua U'Cearbhain of Erris, who supposedly foresaw both the coming of the railway to Achill and that its first and last trains would carry home the dead, a prophecy already associated with the Clew Bay Drowning of 1894. The bodies were brought home by boat and then by a special train reopened for the purpose, with crowds gathering at bridges, level crossings and stations along the route to pay their respects, and the victims were buried at Kildavnet cemetery, where a memorial stands today. The Achill line closed permanently on 30 September 1937, two weeks after the fire.

==== Shark Island tragedy (1951) ====
In 1951, the English actor and film-maker Hugh Falkus, having heard a BBC radio programme about the industrial-scale fishing of basking sharks on Achill, decided to make a low-budget film about the practice. The production centred on Charles Osborne, a Donegal-born fisherman settled at Pollagh on Achill, who served as the film's art director and appeared on screen alongside a small cast and crew. On 12 May, while filming fishing scenes near the Daisy Rocks in fog, an eight-metre freak wave struck and capsized the crew's boat, the Pride of Cratlagh. Falkus swam ashore through freezing water to raise the alarm and was rescued by a passing fishing boat, but Sam Lee and Diana Falkus were found dead near the wreck, while the bodies of Charles Osborne and Bill Brendon were never recovered. Falkus later completed the film, donating its modest proceeds to the dependants of those who had died.

== Places of interest ==
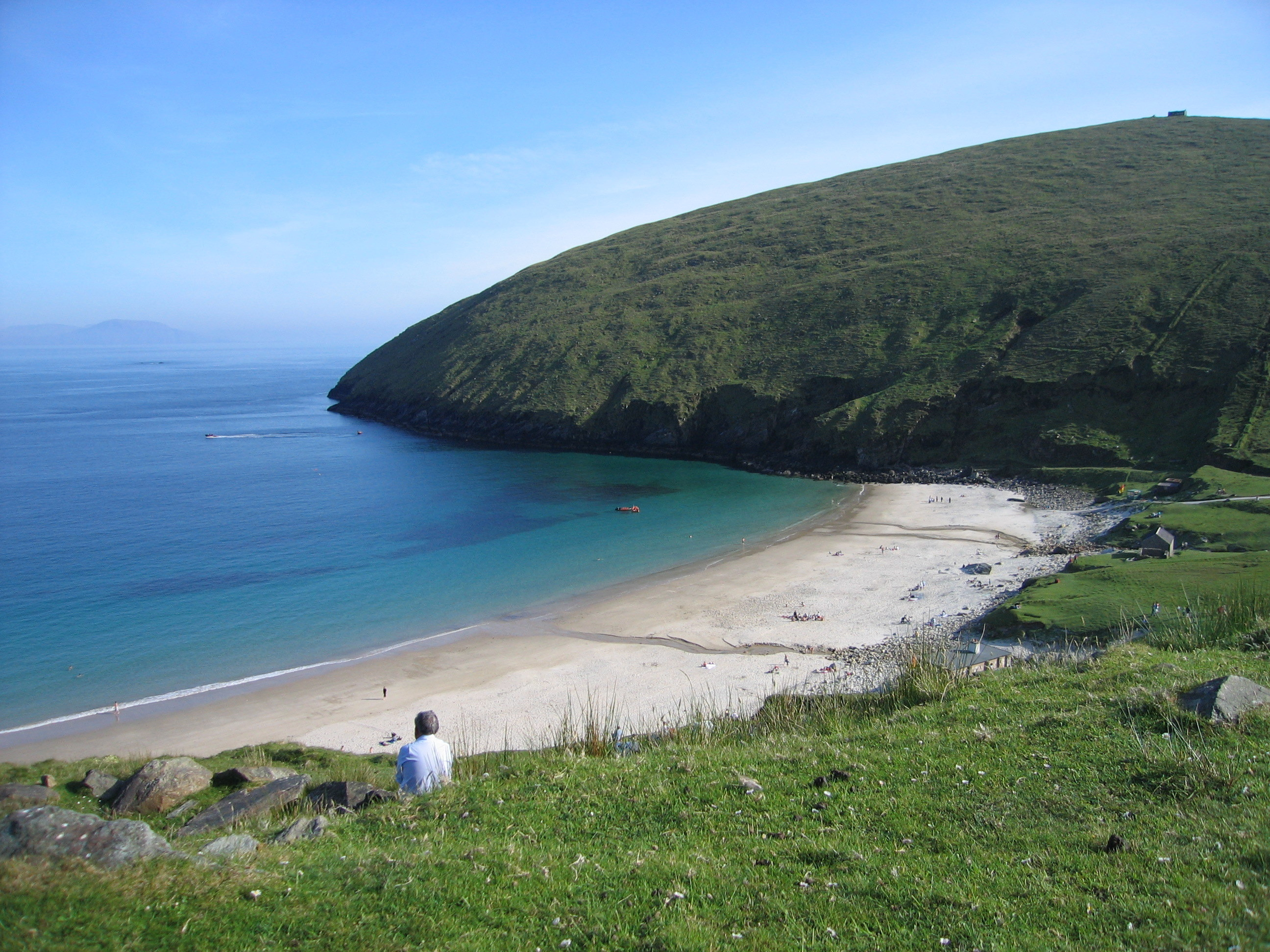
Keem Bay

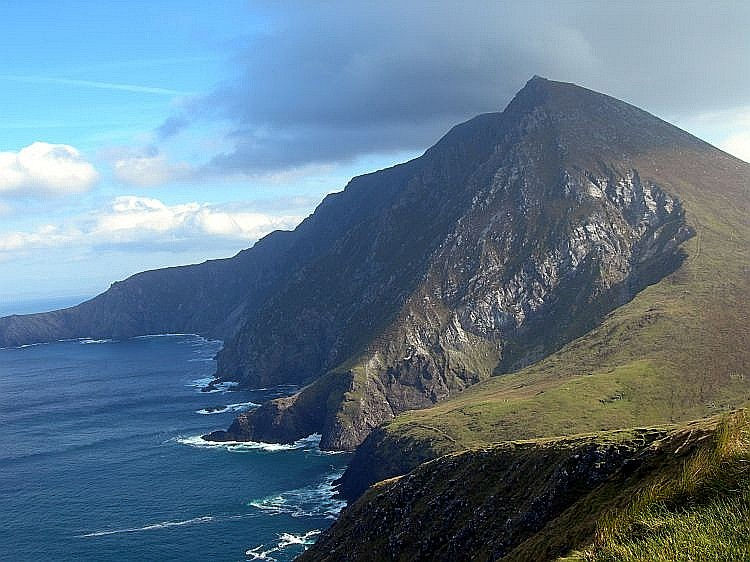
Croaghaun, the third highest sea cliff in Europe

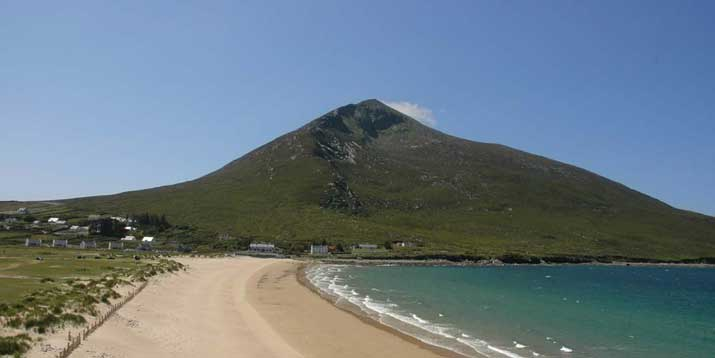
Slievemore mountain dominates the centre of the island

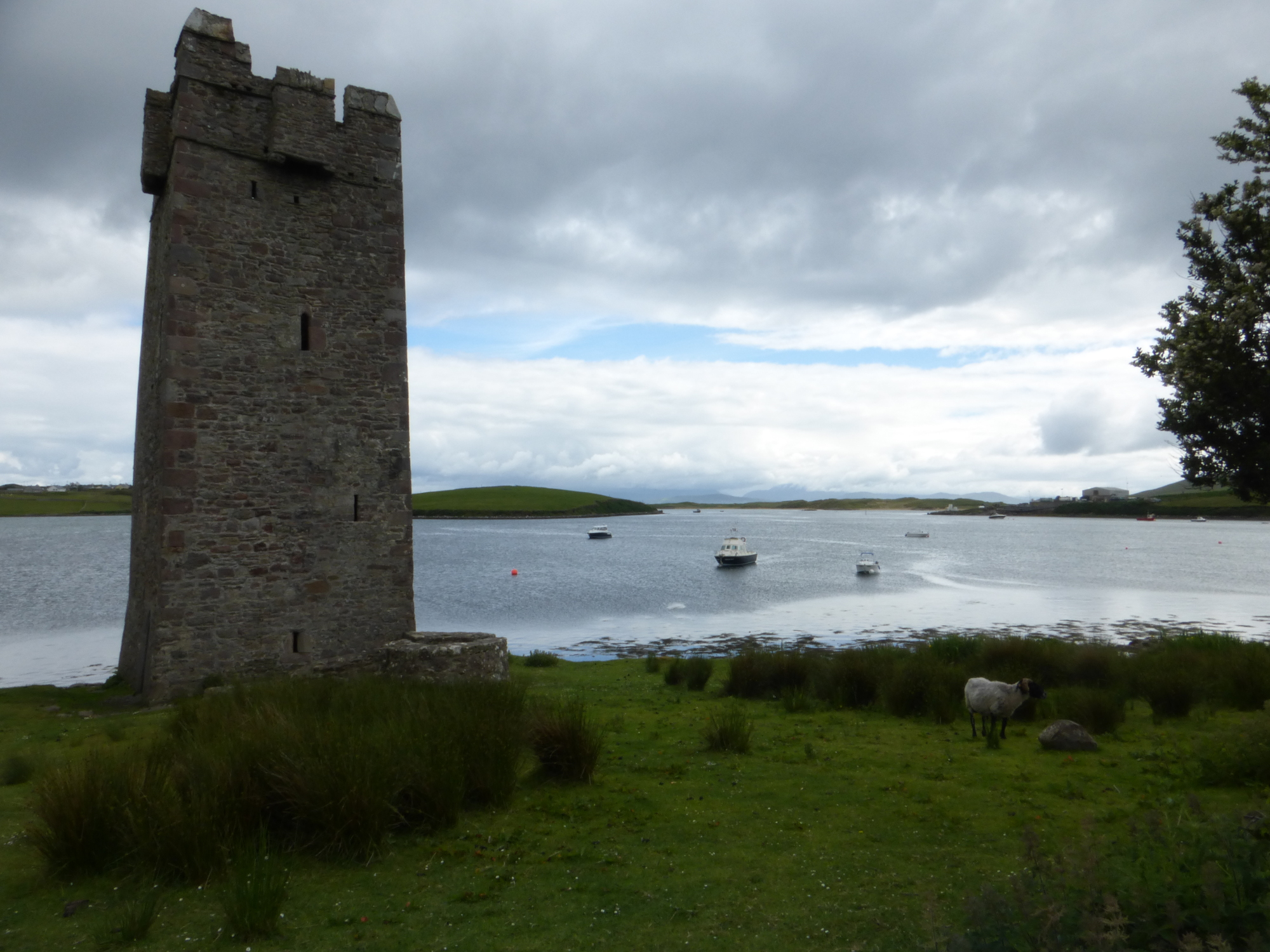
Caisleán Ghráinne, also known as Kildownet Castle

The cliffs of Croaghaun at the western end of the island are the third-highest sea cliffs in Europe but are inaccessible by road. Near the westernmost point of Achill, Achill Head, is Keem Bay. Keel Beach is visited by tourists and used as a surfing location. South of Keem Beach is Moytoge Head, which, with its rounded appearance, drops dramatically down to the ocean. An old British observation post, built during World War I to prevent the Germans from landing arms for the Irish Republican Army, still stands on Moytoge. During the Emergency (WWII), this post was rebuilt by the Irish Defence Forces as a lookout post for the Coast Watching Service wing of the Defence Forces. It operated from 1939 to 1945.

The mountain of Slievemore, (672 m) rises dramatically in the north of the island. On its slopes is an abandoned village, the "Deserted Village". West of this ruined village is an old Martello tower, again built by the British to warn of any possible French invasion during the Napoleonic Wars. The area also has an approximately 5000-year-old Neolithic tomb.

Achillbeg (Acaill Beag, Little Achill) is a small island just off Achill's southern tip. Its inhabitants were resettled on Achill in the 1960s. A plaque to the boxer Johnny Kilbane, whose father was from Achill, was erected at Achillbeg to celebrate 100 years since his first championship win.

Caisleán Ghráinne, also known as Kildownet Castle, is a small tower house built in the early 1400s. It is located in Cloughmore, on the south of Achill Island. It is noted for its associations with Grace O'Malley, along with the larger Rockfleet Castle in Newport.

== Economy and tourism ==
Remittances from emigrants and seasonal migrant labour were important to Achill's economy: T. W. Freeman reported that, in the Achill and Newport area, migratory labour was the leading ancillary source of income and American remittances the second, and quoted R. L. Praeger as stating that Achill's population in 1898 was maintained by “American money sent home by absent sons and daughters”. In the past, fishing was a significant activity, but this aspect of the economy has since reduced. At one stage, the island was known for its shark fishing, and basking shark in particular was fished for its valuable shark liver oil.

During the 1960s and 1970s, there was growth in tourism. The largest employers on Achill include its two hotels. The island has several bars, cafes and restaurants. The island's Atlantic location means that seafood, including lobster, mussels, salmon, oysters, trout and winkles, are common. Lamb and beef are also popular.

== Religion ==
Most people on Achill are either Roman Catholic or Anglican (Church of Ireland).

Catholic churches on the island include: Bunnacurry Church (Saint Josephs), The Valley Church (only open for certain events), Pollagh Church, Dooega Church and Achill Sound Church. There is a Church of Ireland church (St. Thomas's church) at Dugort. The House of Prayer, a controversial "religious retreat" on the island, was established in 1993.

== Artists ==
For almost two centuries, a number of artists have had a close relationship with Achill Island, including the landscape painter Paul Henry. Within the emerging Irish Free State, Paul Henry's landscapes from Achill and other areas reinforced a vision of Ireland of communities living in harmony with the land. He lived in Achill for almost a decade with his wife, artist Grace Henry and, while using similar subject-matter, the pair developed very different styles.

This relationship of artists with Achill was particularly intense in the early decades of the twentieth century when Eva O'Flaherty (1874–1963) became a focal point for artistic networking on the island. A network of over 200 artists linked to Achill is charted in "Achill Painters - An Island History" and includes painters such as the Belgian Marie Howet, the American Robert Henri, the modernist painter Mainie Jellett and contemporary artist Camille Souter.

The 2018 Coming Home Art & The Great Hunger exhibition, in partnership with The Great Hunger Museum of Quinnipiac University, USA, featured Achill's Deserted Village and the island lazy beds prominently in works by Geraldine O'Reilly and Alanna O'Kelly; also included was an 1873 painting, 'Cottage, Achill Island' by Alexander Williams – one of the first artists to open up the island to a wider audience.

== Education ==
Following the 1695 introduction of Penal Laws that prohibited Catholics and Presbyterians in Ireland from practising their religion, unofficial or secret hedge schools were active in Achill during the 17th to 19th centuries.

At the turn of the 21st century, nine national schools operated on the island; as of 2022, there were six. The island also had two secondary schools, McHale College and Scoil Damhnait, which amalgamated in 2011 to form Coláiste Pobail Acla.

== Transport ==
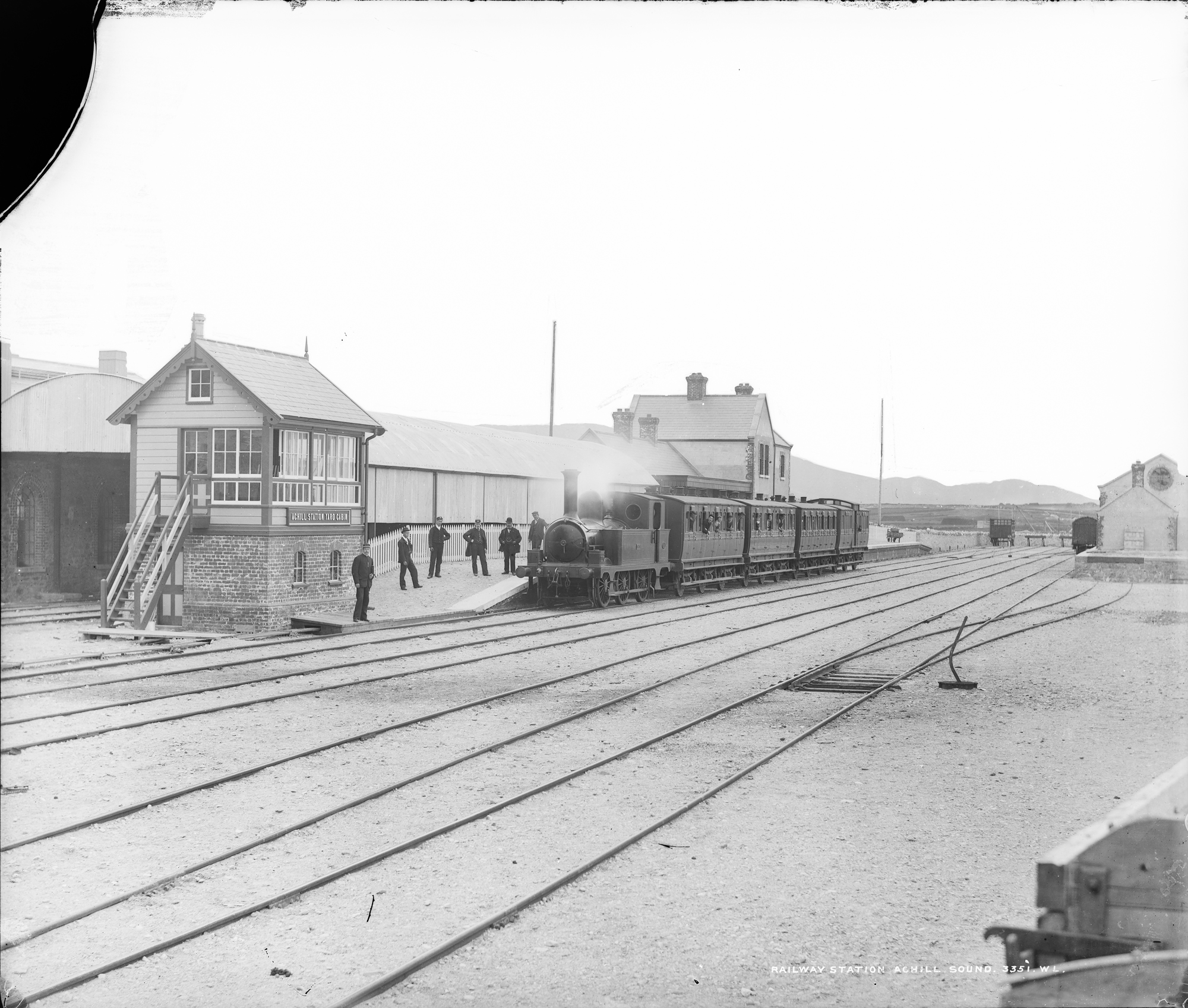
As of the early 20th century, a railway station operated on Achill.

=== Rail ===
Achill railway station, still on the mainland and not on the island, was opened by the Midland Great Western Railway on 13 May 1895, the terminus of its line from Westport via Newport and Mulranny. The station, and the line, were closed by the Great Southern Railways on 1 October 1937. The Great Western Greenway, created during 2010 and 2011, follows the line's route and has proved to be very successful in attracting visitors to Achill and the surrounding areas.

=== Road ===
The R319 road is the main road onto the island.

Bus Éireann's route 450 operates several times daily to Westport and Louisburgh from the island. Bus Éireann also provides transport for the area's secondary school children.

== Sport ==
Achill has a Gaelic football club which competes in the junior championship and division 1E of the Mayo League. There are also Achill Rovers which play in the Mayo Association Football League.

There is a 9-hole links golf course on the island. Outdoor activities can be done through Achill Outdoor Education Centre. Achill Island's rugged landscape and the surrounding ocean offers multiple locations for outdoor adventure activities, like surfing, kite-surfing and sea kayaking. Fishing and watersports are also common. Sailing regattas featuring a local vessel type, the Achill Yawl, have been run since the 19th century.

== Demographics ==
In 2016, the population was 2,594, with 5.2% of respondents indicating that they spoke Irish on a daily basis outside the education system. The island's population has declined from around 6,000 before the Great Famine of the mid-19th century.

The table below reports data on Achill Island's population taken from Discover the Islands of Ireland (Alex Ritsema, Collins Press, 1999) and the census of Ireland.

Historical population

| Year | Pop. | ±% |
|---|---|---|
| 1841 | 4,901 | — |
| 1851 | 4,030 | −17.8% |
| 1861 | 4,424 | +9.8% |
| 1871 | 4,757 | +7.5% |
| 1881 | 5,060 | +6.4% |
| 1891 | 4,677 | −7.6% |
| 1901 | 4,825 | +3.2% |
| 1911 | 5,260 | +9.0% |
| 1926 | 4,790 | −8.9% |

| Year | Pop. | ±% |
|---|---|---|
| 1936 | 4,808 | +0.4% |
| 1946 | 4,918 | +2.3% |
| 1951 | 4,906 | −0.2% |
| 1956 | 4,493 | −8.4% |
| 1961 | 4,069 | −9.4% |
| 1966 | 3,598 | −11.6% |
| 1971 | 3,129 | −13.0% |
| 1979 | 3,089 | −1.3% |
| 1981 | 3,101 | +0.4% |

| Year | Pop. | ±% |
|---|---|---|
| 1986 | 3,161 | +1.9% |
| 1991 | 2,802 | −11.4% |
| 1996 | 2,718 | −3.0% |
| 2002 | 2,620 | −3.6% |
| 2006 | 2,620 | +0.0% |
| 2011 | 2,569 | −1.9% |
| 2016 | 2,440 | −5.0% |
| 2022 | 2,345 | −3.9% |

Sources: Central Statistics Office. "CNA17: Population by Off Shore Island, Sex and Year". CSO.ie. Population of Inhabited Islands Off the Coast (Report). Central Statistics Office. 2023.

== Notable people ==
- Heinrich Böll (1917–1985), German writer who spent several summers with his family and later lived several months per year on the island
- Charles Boycott (1832–1897), unpopular landowner from whom the term "boycott" arose
- Finbar Cafferkey (1977–2023), political activist and soldier. Died during the Battle of Bakhmut in April 2023
- Nancy Corrigan (1912–1983), pioneer aviator, second female commercial pilot in the US
- Dermot Freyer (1883–1970), writer who opened a hotel on the island.
- Graham Greene (1904–1991), author, who stayed on the island several times in the late 1940s and wrote parts of several novels there
- Paul Henry (1876–1958), artist, stayed on the island for a number of years in the early 1900s
- James Kilbane (b.1970), singer, lives on the island
- Saoirse McHugh (b.1990), former Green Party politician
- Eva O'Flaherty (1874–1963), nationalist, model and milliner
- Manus Patten (1902–1977), recipient of the Scott Medal
- Thomas Patten (1910–1936), from Dooega. Died during the Siege of Madrid in December 1936
- Honor Tracy (1913–1989), author, lived for a number of years on Achill

== In popular culture ==
The island is featured throughout the film The Banshees of Inisherin in various locations on the island including Keem Bay, Cloughmore, and Purteen Pier.

The island is also the primary setting of the visual novel If Found....

== See also ==
- List of islands of County Mayo
