= Corraun Peninsula =

Peninsula on the west coast of Ireland

Coordinates: 53.9171°N 9.8644°W

An Corrán
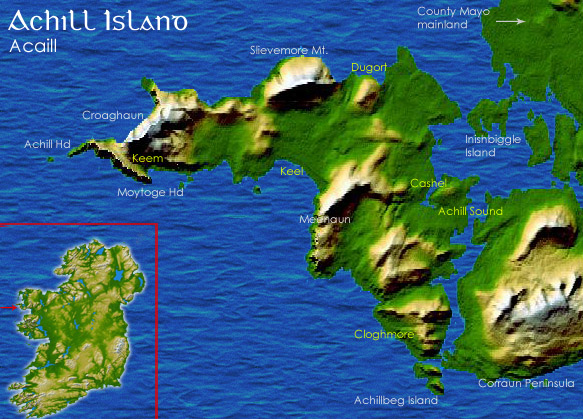
- Achill Island and to the east, Corraun Peninsula
- Interactive map of An Corrán

Geography
- Location: County Mayo, Ireland

Demographics
- Population: 726 (2016)
- Languages: Irish

An Corrán, known in English as Currane or the Corraun Peninsula, is a peninsula in County Mayo, on the west coast of Ireland. It extends out from the mainland towards Achill Island.

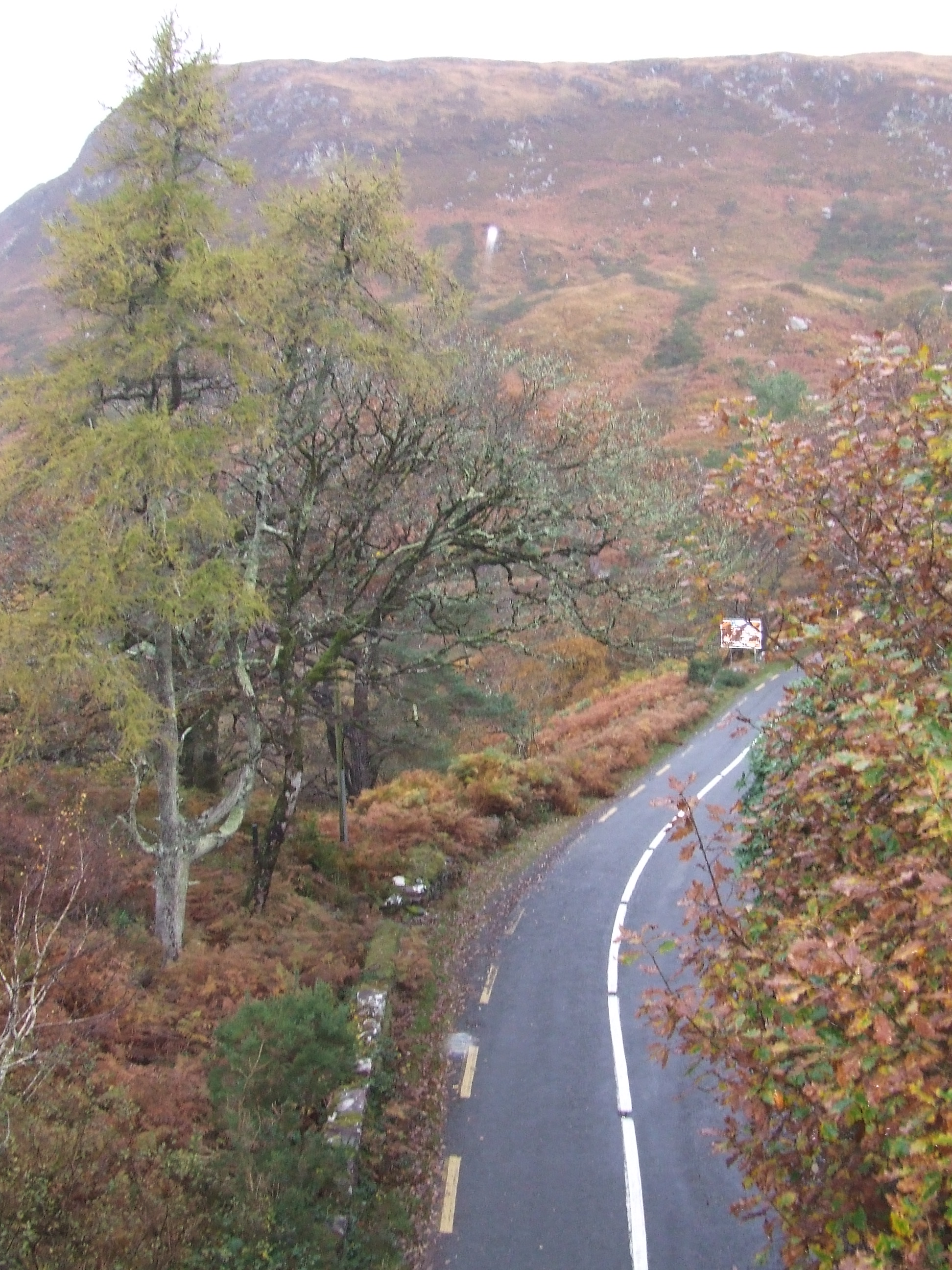
A road on the Corraun peninsula, near Mulranny as viewed from a bridge on the Great Western Greenway. Halloween, 2014.

Thoroughfares on the peninsula include the Great Western Greenway, which passes through the north side of the peninsula, following a scenic route.

As of 2016 the population of the Corraun peninsula was 726. The entire peninsula is in the Gaeltacht (designated Irish speaking region) with 12% of the population claiming to speak Irish on a daily basis outside the education system. The peninsula is immediately east of Achill Island, and forms part of the parish of Achill. It comprises the villages of Tornragee, Polranny, Belfarsad, Corraun (Currane) and Dogh Beg.

Achill Island is connected to the peninsula via the Michael Davitt Bridge.

Corraun is dominated by Corraun Hill (524 m). There are views of Clew Bay and the Mullet Peninsula to the north.

== Sport ==
Corraun is the home of Fr Griffin Park, the Community Sports Field overlooking views of Croagh Patrick, Achillbeg Island and Clare Island. It hosts rugby, Gaelic football, and soccer matches.

Mulranny United Football Club play all their home league games here. In the past it has also hosted Achill Rovers.

== Gallery ==
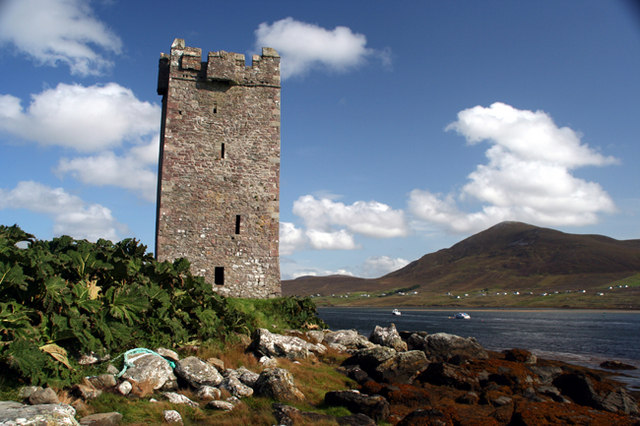
The castle and Corraun Hill

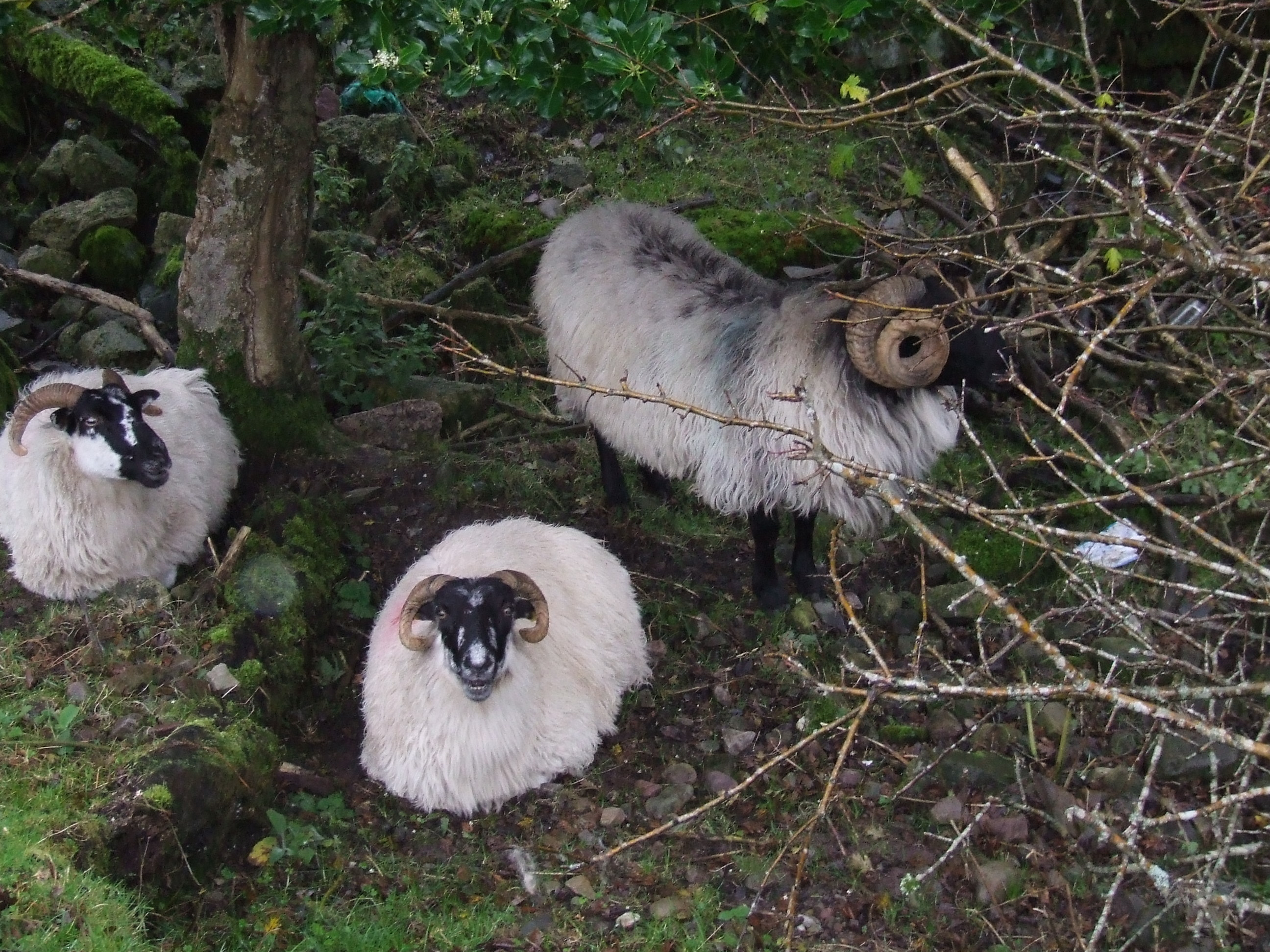
Sheep in a paddock by the Great Western Greenway near Mulranny. November 2014
