= Polranny =

Village in Ireland

Coordinates: 53.931°N 9.896°W

Polranny (Poll Rathnaí, trans. Hole of the Ferns or Fern Hollow) is a village in County Mayo in the province of Connacht in the Republic of Ireland. The Michael Davitt Bridge connects Polranny on the mainland to Achill Island.
