= Mulloy Brothers =

The Mulloy Brothers were a traditional Irish ballad group from Mulranny, County Mayo, on the west coast of the Republic of Ireland. Tom, Pat, Martin and Michael Mulloy have been performing since 1965, in a career that has involved several tours around the US and Europe. After 53 years of touring, the band came to an end after the death of Tom Mulloy on 21 September 2018 following a brain tumour. Pat Mulloy is the last surviving member, but still performs.

The group were formed when the members were as gasúrs that performed during intervals at concerts and theatre plays around County Mayo. After lounge bar singing became popular in Ireland in the 1960s, they became the resident band at Corrigan's Singing Lounge in Mulranny, and began touring the country. Michael Mulloy died of cancer on 8 February 2007 aged 57, and banjo player Martin Mulloy died on 22 May 2010, drowning in a boating accident. He was 58 years old.

In 2015, the remaining members celebrated 50 years on the road with a concert in Mulranny Park Hotel.
