= Mulranny =

Seaside village in County Mayo, Ireland

Mulranny Irish: An Mhala Raithní
- Village
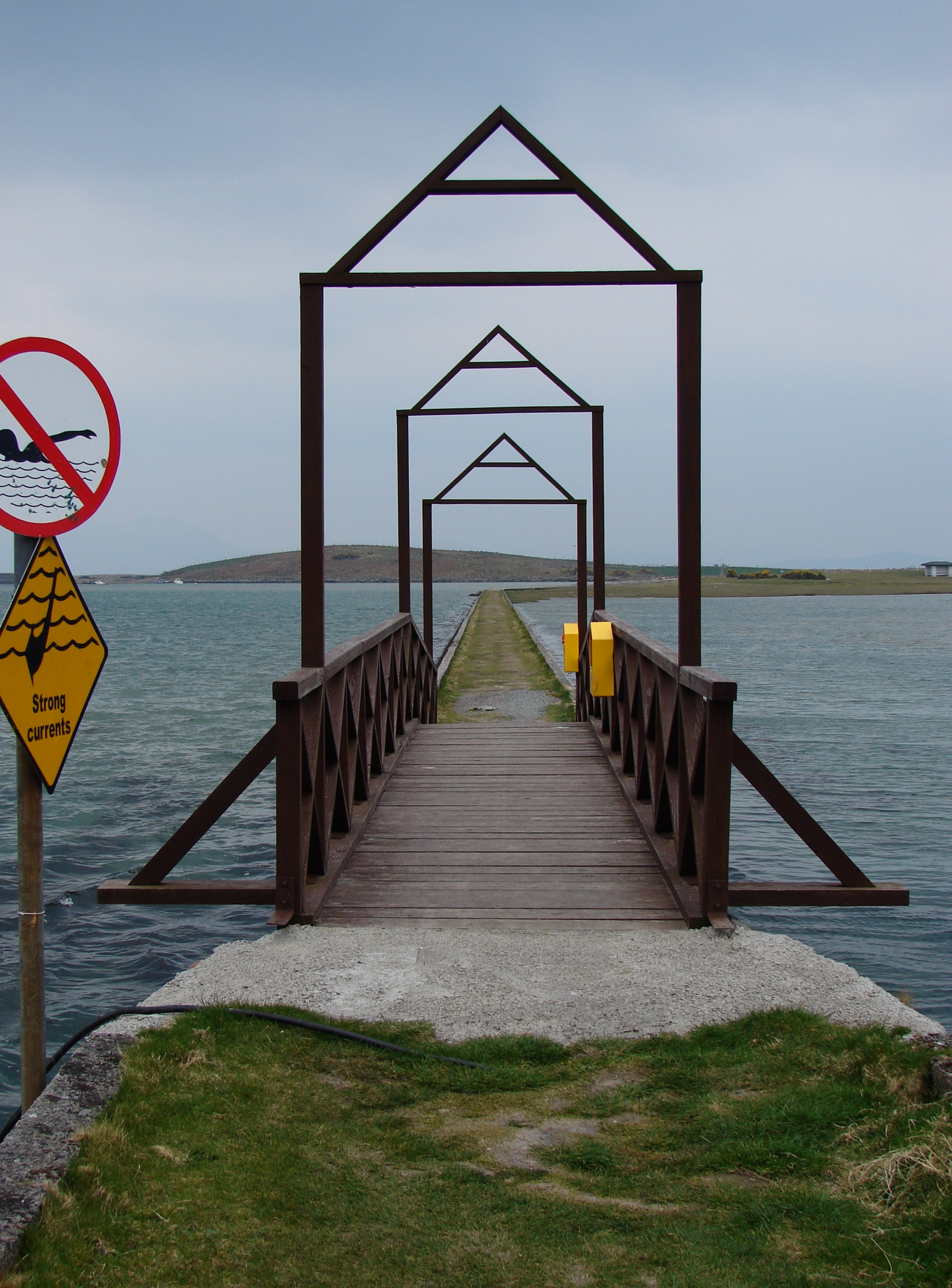
- The Causeway located at the beach at Mulranny

- Location in Ireland
- Coordinates: 53°54′24″N 9°46′53″W
- Country: Ireland
- Province: Connacht
- County: County Mayo

Population (2022)
  - Total: 315
- Time zone: UTC+0 (WET)
  - Summer (DST): UTC-1 (IST (WEST))
- Irish Grid Reference: L824964

Mulranny or Mallaranny (Irish: An Mhala Raithní, meaning 'the hill-brow of the ferns')—sometimes spelt as 'Mulrany', 'Malaranny', 'Mullaranny', 'Mullranny' or 'Mulranny'—is a seaside village on the isthmus between Clew Bay and Blacksod Bay in County Mayo, Ireland. Located at the foot of the Nephin Mountain Range, Mulranny has a number of blue flag beaches and a coastal lagoon. The Corraun Peninsula, which contains three mountain peaks, is situated across Clew Bay.

== Transport ==
Mulranny is located on the N59 national secondary road. Bus routes serving the area include Bus Éireann route 450 (Dooagh-Westport-Louisburgh) and Local Link route 978 (Castlebar-Belmullet).

== Tourism ==
Mulranny lies on the 42 km Great Western Greenway, which runs between Westport and Achill. In 2011, it was the winner of a 'European Destinations of Excellence' award.

A type of heather, Erica erigena, which is unique to the area, is celebrated during the annual summer "Mulranny Mediterranean Heather Festival".

== Notable people ==
- Ernst Chain, credited with developing the application of penicillin alongside Alexander Fleming, had a home in the area.
- Ollie Conmy, former Irish international soccer player.
- Jerry Cowley, Irish barrister, medical doctor and former politician, lives locally.
- Desmond Llewelyn, known for his role as "Q" in the James Bond movies, also had a home locally.
- Colm McManamon, Gaelic footballer.
- Matt McManamon, a Liverpool-born musician who moved to Mulranny in the late 2000s
- Mulloy Brothers, a traditional Irish music group.

== See also ==
- List of towns and villages in Ireland
