= Croaghaun =

Mountain in County Mayo, Ireland

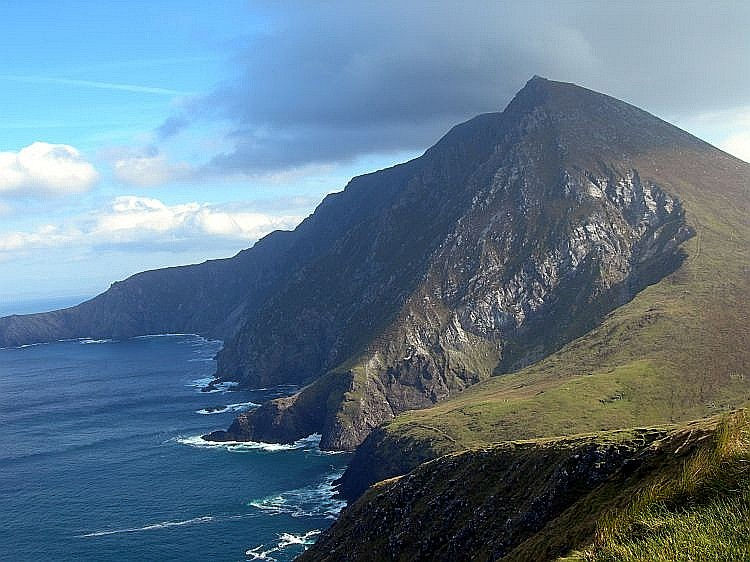

Highest point
- Elevation: 688 m (2,257 ft)
- Prominence: 688 m (2,257 ft)
- Parent peak: None
- Listing: P600, Marilyn, Hewitt
- Coordinates: 53.981°N 10.204°W

Naming
- Native name: Cruachán (Irish)
- English translation: little stack

Geography
- Location within island of Ireland
- Location: County Mayo, Ireland
- Parent range: Achill Island
- OSI/OSNI grid: F553060

Croaghaun (Irish: Cruachán) is a mountain on Achill Island in County Mayo, Ireland. At 688 metres (2,257 ft), it has the highest sea cliffs in Ireland, as well as the third-highest sea cliffs in Europe, after Hornelen, Norway, and Cape Enniberg, Faroe Islands.

== Geography ==
Comparison of cliffs in Europe

Croaghaun is the most westerly peak of Achill Island and its highest mountain. The cliffs lie on the northern slope of the mountain and can be seen only by hiking around or to the summit of the mountain or from the sea. They are part of a sequence of sheer rock faces which start south of Keem Bay and loop around the uninhabited north-west of the island, by Achill Head and Saddle Head, and east to Slievemore, occasionally dropping vertically into the waters of the Atlantic Ocean.

== Nature ==
The Croaghaun cliffs are home to two families of peregrine falcons (RTÉ, 2008). September and October are the best time to see them here, as they teach their young to fly. Metamorphic, quartz-laden gems may be observed, along with Mediterranean heathers. It is common to see schools of bottlenose dolphins and basking sharks, once a source of revenue for Achill Island (BBC, 2009). Porpoises are found in large numbers. Orcas, humpback whales, and other whales have been sighted.

== See also ==
- Lists of mountains in Ireland
- Coastal landforms of Ireland
