= Achillbeg =

Island in County Mayo, Ireland

Native name: Acaill Bheag
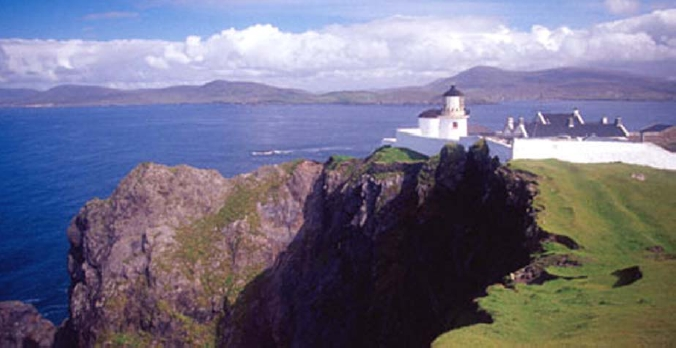
- Achillbeg's lighthouse

- Location within island of Ireland

Geography
- Location: Atlantic Ocean
- Coordinates: 53°51′N 9°57′W

Administration
- Ireland
- Province: Connacht
- County: Mayo

Demographics
- Population: 1 (2016 census)

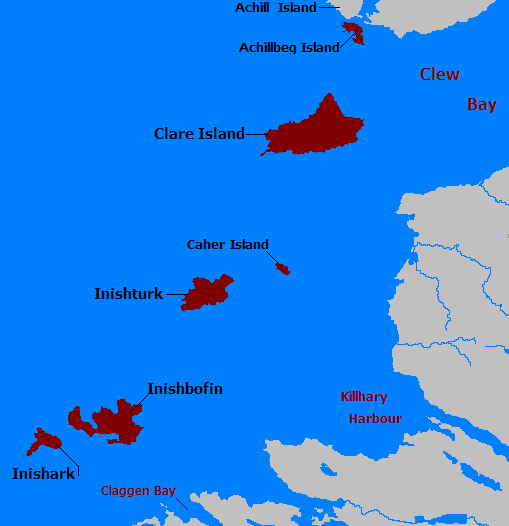
Mayo islands

Acaill Bheag, or Achillbeg, is a small island in County Mayo, Ireland, just off the southern tip of Achill Island. The island is located within a Gaeltacht (Irish speaking) area.

== Name and history ==
The English name Achillbeg derives from the Irish Acaill Bheag meaning "Little Achill".

Having been inhabited for over 3000 years, Acaill Bheag was evacuated in 1965 and the inhabitants were settled on the main (Achill) island and nearby mainland. A lighthouse on Acaill Bheag's southern tip was completed in 1965 to replace and coincide with the closure of the lighthouse on nearby Clare Island.

A book about the life and times of the island and its people, Achillbeg - The Life of an Island by Jonathan Beaumont, was published in 2005. The Irish artist Pete Hogan also wrote a book about his time spent living on the island in 1983, The Artist on the Island: An Achill Journal, which was published in 2013.

In 2012, a small plaque was built on Achillbeg to celebrate 100 years since boxer Johnny Kilbane's first championship win. Though born in Ohio, Kilbane's father was from the area.

== Geography ==
The main settlement was in the centre of the island, bounded by two hills to the north and south. There are a small number of holiday homes on the island, but they are usually empty for most of the year. Access to the island is from Cé Mhór, in the village of An Chloich Mhór (Cloghmore), by local arrangement.

== Demographics ==
The table below reports data on Achillbeg's population taken from Discover the Islands of Ireland (1999) and the Census of Ireland.

Historical population

Year	Pop.	±%
1841	178	—
1851	149	−16.3%
1861	137	−8.1%
1871	93	−32.1%
1881	105	+12.9%
1891	113	+7.6%
1901	104	−8.0%
1911	117	+12.5%
1926	99	−15.4%

Year	Pop.	±%
1936	67	−32.3%
1946	63	−6.0%
1951	54	−14.3%
1956	50	−7.4%
1961	38	−24.0%
1966	0	−100.0%
1971	0	0.00%
1979	0	0.00%
1981	0	0.00%

Year	Pop.	±%
1986	0	0.00%
1991	0	0.00%
1996	0	0.00%
2002	0	0.00%
2006	0	0.00%
2011	0	0.00%
2016	1	—

Source: Central Statistics Office. "CNA17: Population by Off Shore Island, Sex and Year". CSO.ie. (E2021 for 2016 figures)
