= Neolithic tomb =

Ancient burial sites and crypts

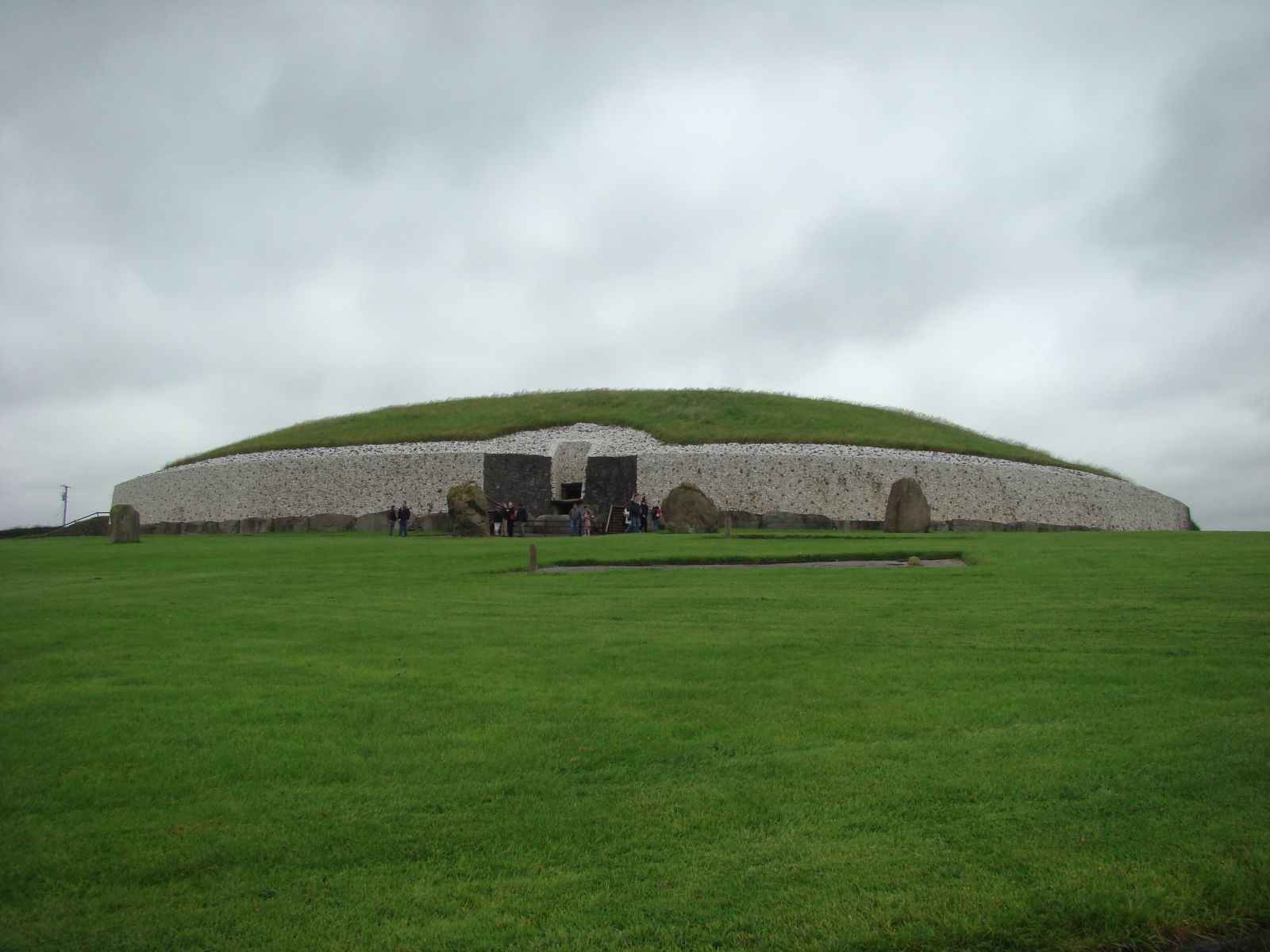
Newgrange

Neolithic tombs are structures built by humans during the New Stone Age.

== Types ==
=== Northwestern Europe ===
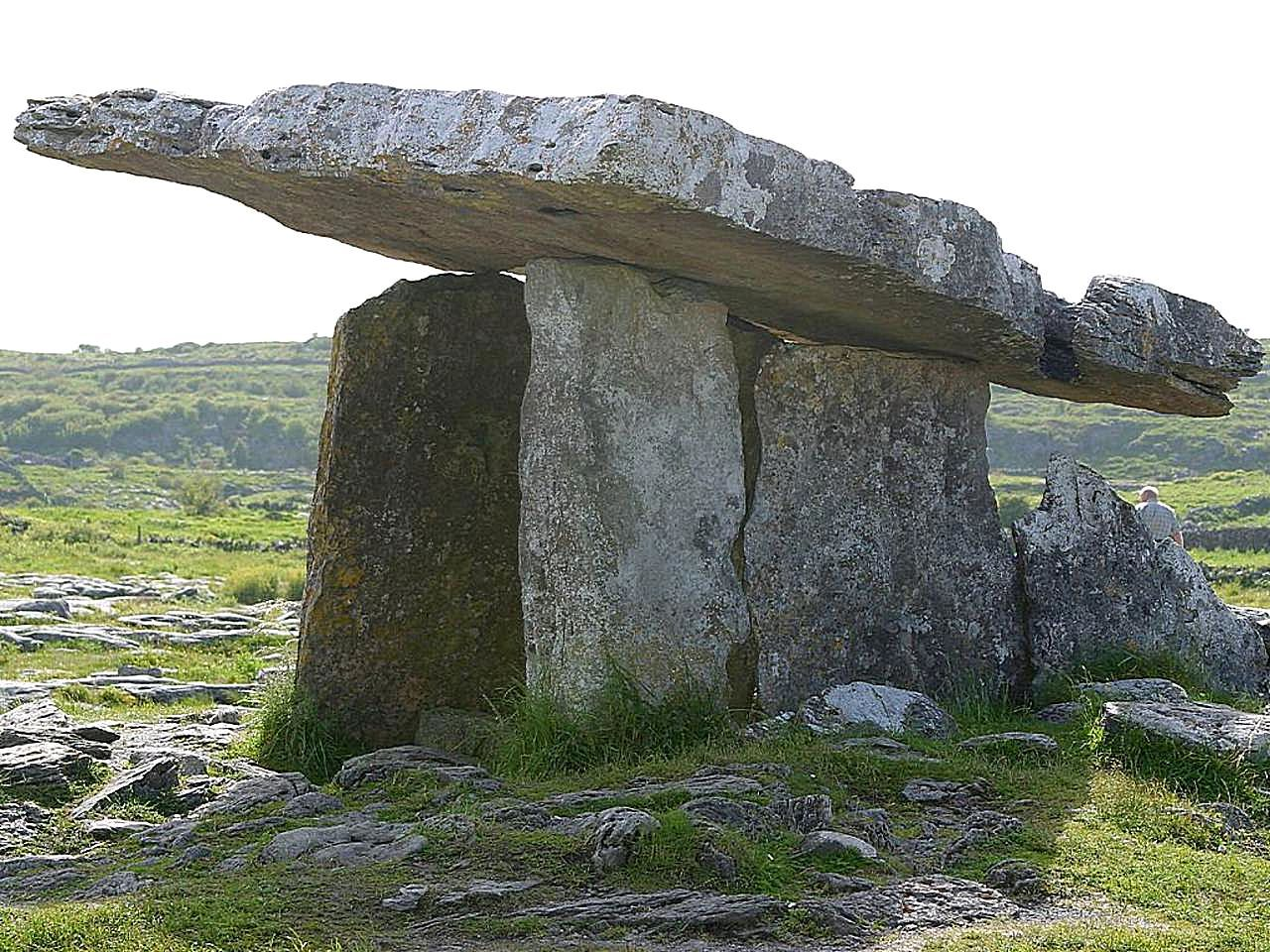
Poulnabrone dolmen, the Burren, County Clare, Ireland.

The main types in Northwestern Europe, particularly Ireland, include passage graves, court cairn, and menhir.

All these types of tomb were built from large slabs of rock which were uncut or worked only slightly. In each case, there was a "doorway" made from two large stones facing each other.

The doorway led to an inner chamber, or a passage and chamber, lined with flat slabs. In all but the portal dolmens, the tomb was then covered in earth and small stones to make a mound.

=== Asia ===
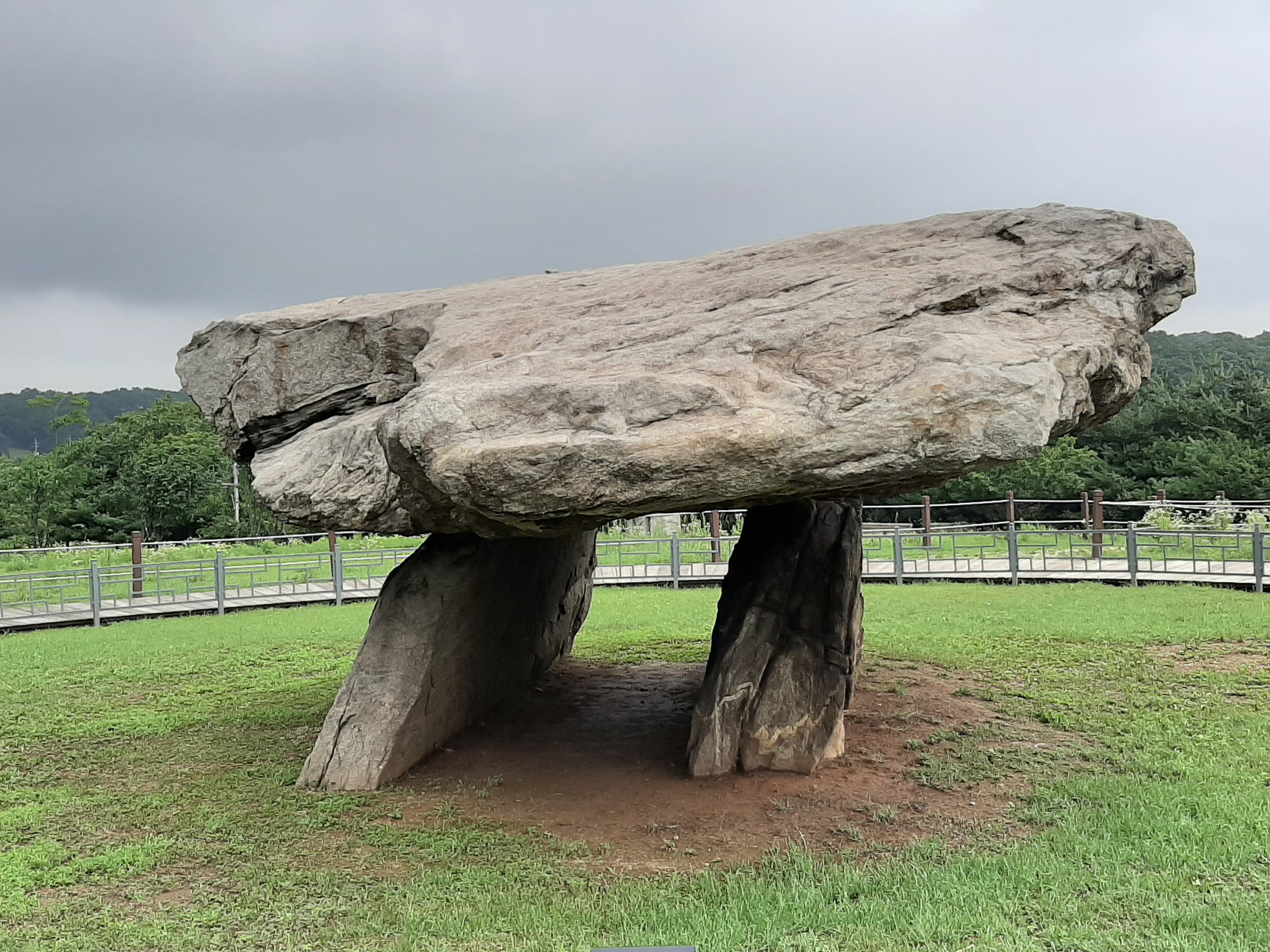
Dolmen at Ganghwa Island, South Korea

The five types of Neolithic tombs found in Korea include dolmen or menhir, cist, cairn, urn, and wooden chamber.

== Uses ==
While some of these stone structures did indeed have human remains contained within them, it is erroneous to suggest that they all were "tombs". It is peculiar to note that after being in use for 3–4,000 years many of these contained no bones whatsoever. Some remains that were carbon dated showed that the interments were inserted hundreds of years after the megaliths were constructed. It would seem that when the original purpose of the "passage tombs" was abandoned, they were adapted for use as crypts by later generations.

== Preservation ==
In England and Ireland, many Neolithic tombs were unwittingly ruined as a result of excavation by antiquarians in the nineteenth century.
