= Keem Bay =

Bay in County Mayo, Ireland

Coordinates: 53.9680°N 10.1939°W

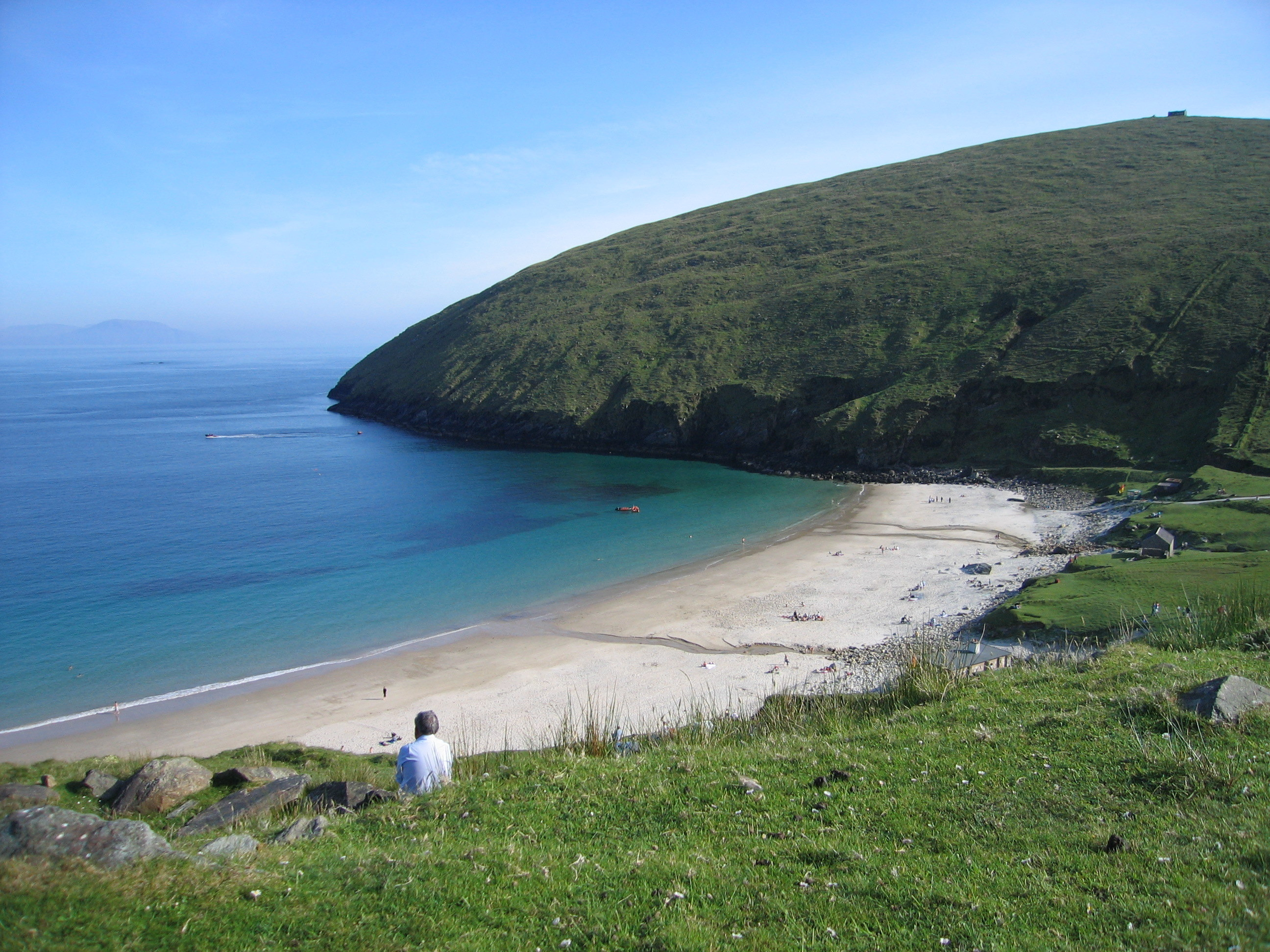
Keem Bay

Keem Bay (Irish: Cuan na Cuime) is located past Dooagh village in the west of Achill Island in County Mayo, Ireland. It contains a Blue Flag beach. The bay was formerly the site of a basking shark fishery.

== Lifeboat Station ==
During the 19th century, the British government established a lifeboat station on Keem Beach. The lifeboat station was operational for over 100 years providing a vital service for those who lived and worked on the coast.

The bay was used as a filming location for the 2022 film The Banshees of Inisherin.
