= Keel, County Mayo =

Keel Irish: An Caol
- Village
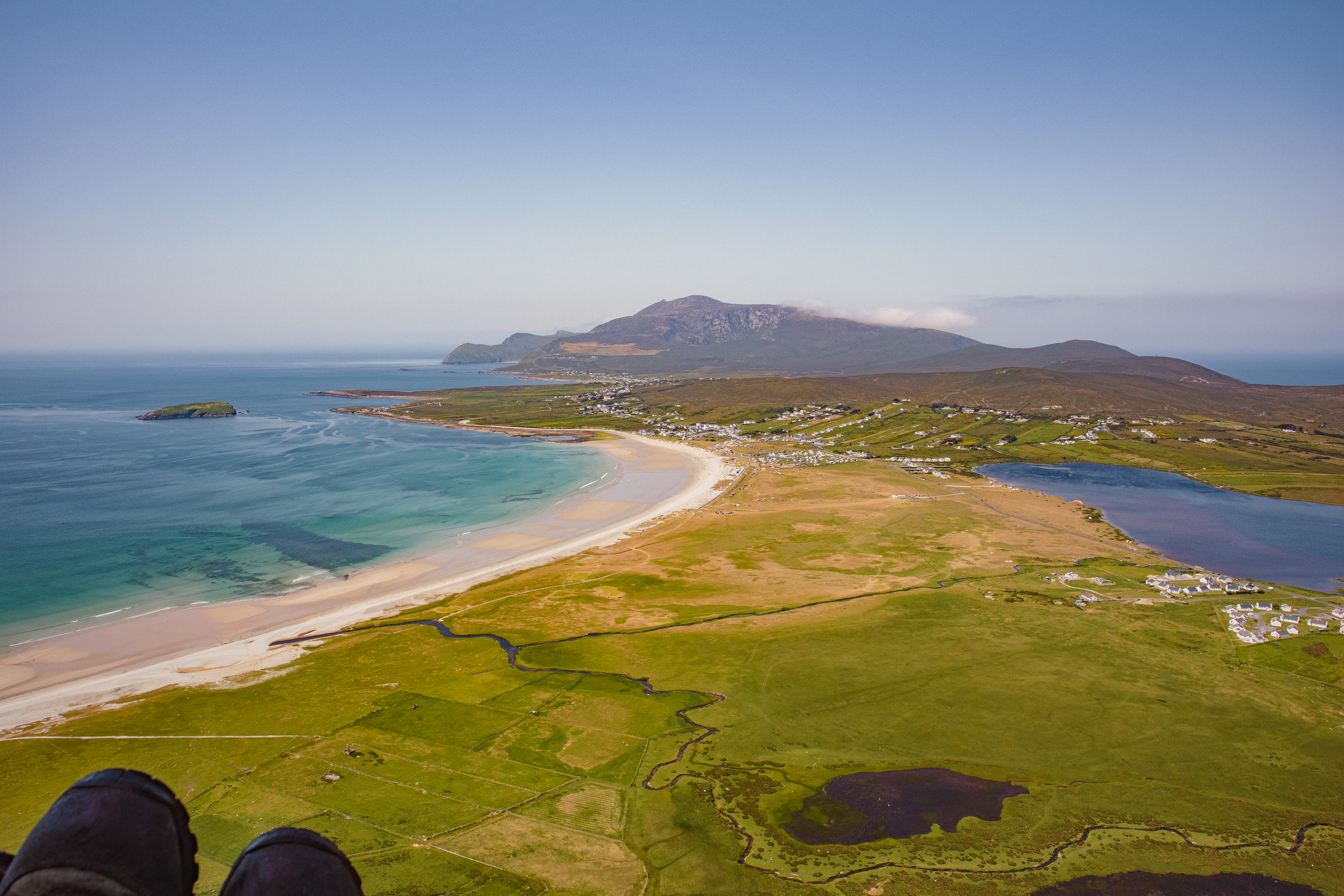
- Keel and its beach seen from Minaun, with Croaghaun mountain in the distance

- Location in Ireland
- Coordinates: 53°58′00″N 10°05′00″W
- Country: Ireland
- Province: Connacht
- County: County Mayo
- Elevation: 60 m (200 ft)

Population (2016)
  - Total: 541
- (includes nearby Dooagh)
- Time zone: UTC+0 (WET)
  - Summer (DST): UTC-1 (IST (WEST))
- Irish Grid Reference: F633039

Keel (Irish: An Caol) is a village on Achill Island in County Mayo, Ireland.

== Transport and access ==
Keel is located on the R319 regional road. Bus Éireann route 450 (Dooagh – Westport – Murrisk – Louisburgh) serves Keel six times daily in each direction on weekdays; three times on Sundays. Connections to Ireland West Airport and Dublin are available at Westport

== See also ==
- List of towns and villages in the Republic of Ireland
