= Michael Davitt Bridge =

Swing bridge in County Mayo, Ireland

Coordinates: 53°55′57.35″N 9°55′20″W

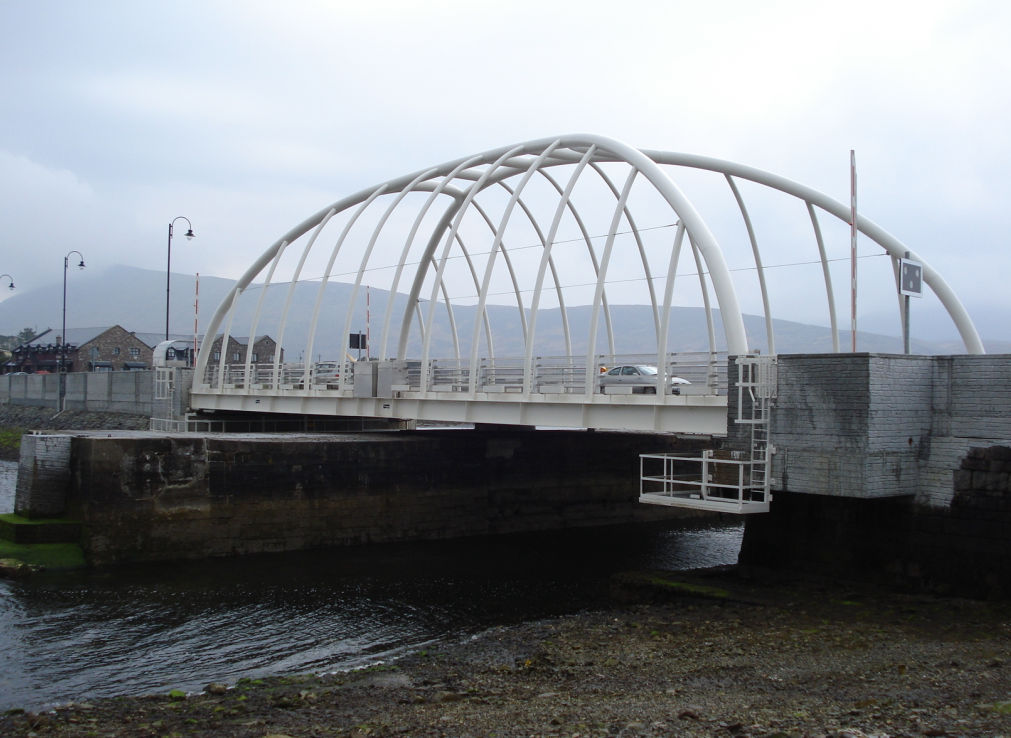
The third bridge in April 2009

The Michael Davitt Bridge (Irish: Droichead Mhícheál Mhic Dháibhéid) is a swing bridge on the R319 road in County Mayo, Ireland that crosses from Achill Island to the mainland.

== History ==
The plan for a bridge to connect Achill Island to the Corraun Peninsula was considered in the early 1880s. A Mayo county surveyor drew up plans, which were approved by J. Price, a civil engineer. The official authorisation was received from the Board of Trade in London and in 1883 an administrative body was organised to finance it; The total cost was projected to be approximately £5,000. While the costs exceeded the estimates, John Grey Vesey Porter of County Fermanagh contributed from his personal funds so that the bridge could be built as designed. The bridge's structure consisted of a steel bowstring girder construction with a span of 37 m (120 ft) pivoting on a central pier. The roadway was 2.4 m (8 ft) in width. It was named for Michael Davitt, 19th-century Irish social campaigner, Fenian, and founder of the National Land League. Davitt officially opened the bridge in 1887.

The 1887 bridge was designed for horse-drawn traffic and deteriorated with the advent of heavier motorised traffic in the 1900s. In 1947, Mayo County Council planned to demolish and replace the bridge. J & C McGloughlin of Dublin undertook the construction, which was the largest bridge construction project by an Irish company at the time. It was completed in early 1949.

By 2007, the bridge had a number of problems with its swing mechanism, which hindered boat traffic. A review of its structures indicated corrosion and Mayo County Council gave its backing to provide a new swing bridge. Its new design, by Malachy Walsh & Partners, was based on a Spanish Calatrava architectural model. SIAC Construction undertook the work and it was opened in 2008. The finished bridge weighs 390 tonnes, but is still operated manually.

In November 2010, the bridge failed to close for over two hours, which resulted in a traffic snarl. Mayo County Council ordered the bridge consultants and contractors to investigate the failure. The senior engineer, Michael Mongan, said minor modifications were put in place to resolve the issues. The bridge recommenced operations on a trial basis and the bridge was back in full operation by the end of March 2011.

On 3 September 2017, the bridge celebrated its 130th anniversary.
