= Great Western Greenway =

Rail trail in County Mayo, Ireland

Coordinates: 53.9103°N 9.634977°W

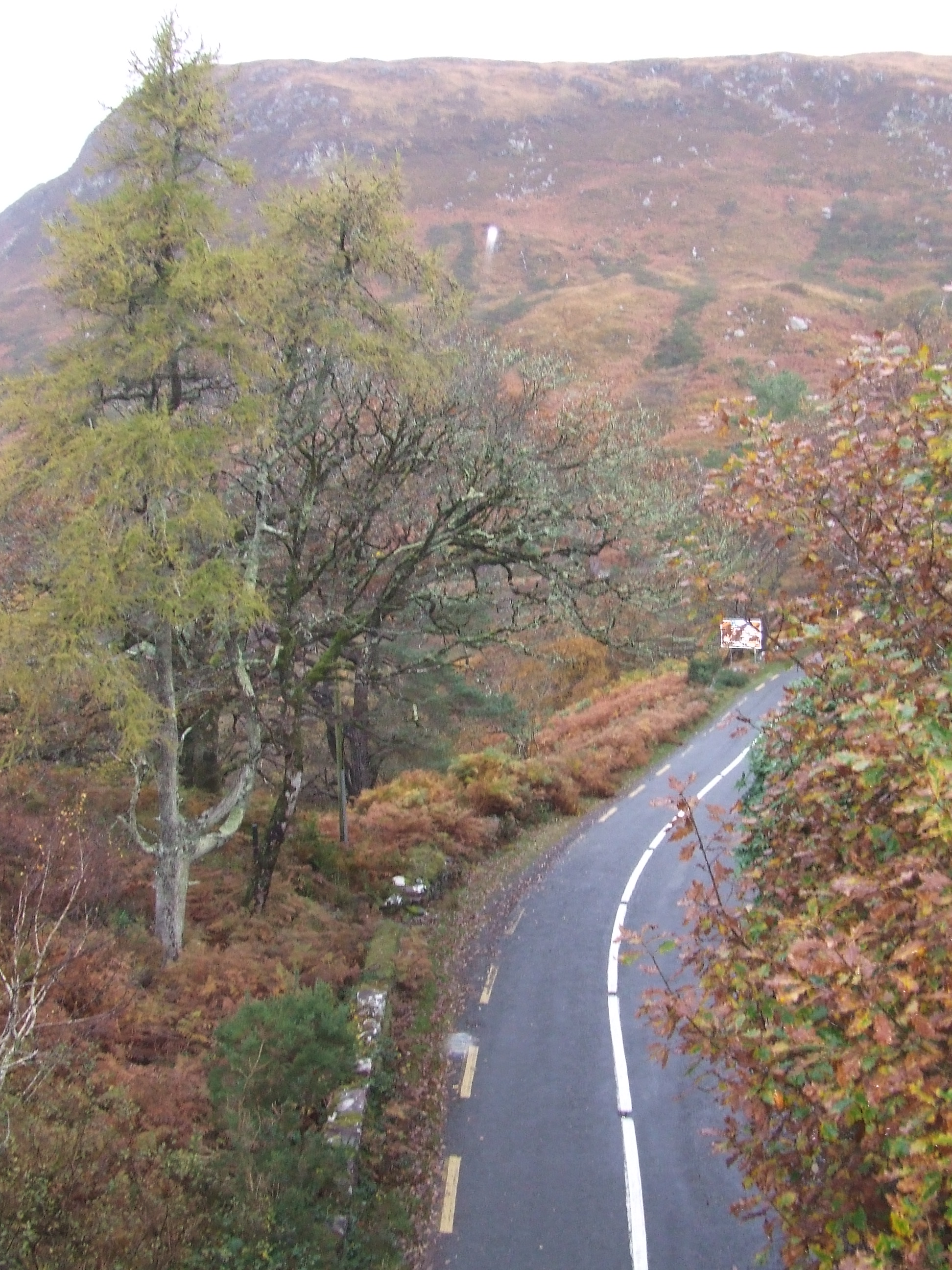
- Corraun Peninsula viewed from the trail
- Length: 42 km (26 mi)
- Location: County Mayo, Ireland
- Trailheads: Westport, Achill
- Use: Cycling and Walking
- Season: Any
- Surface: Tarmac / gravel
- Website: http://www.greenway.ie/

The Great Western Greenway (Irish: Bealach Mór an Iarthair) is a greenway rail trail in County Mayo, Ireland. It is 42 kilometres (26 miles) long and begins in Westport and ends in Achill, passing through the towns of Newport and Mulranny as it runs along the coast of Clew Bay. It is an off-road trail intended for use by cyclists and walkers. It follows the route of the former Achill extension of the Midland Great Western Railway's Westport railway line, which was constructed in the 1890s and closed in 1937. An estimated 300 people cycle and walk the trail each day, which was constructed at a cost of €5.7 million. The first section, from Newport to Mulranny, was opened in April 2010. It was named as the 2011 Irish winner of the European Destinations of Excellence award. The full route was opened by Taoiseach Enda Kenny and Minister of State for Tourism and Sport, Michael Ring on 29 July 2011.

According to a 2013 study, the Great Western Greenway had an average of 471 cycle trips per day, or 172,000 users in total per annum. It brings approximately €405,000 from non-domestic tourists and €737,000 from domestic tourists annually, giving the facility a payback period of 6 years from its initial construction.

After reconstruction of part of the N59 at Kilbride, and completed in September 2013, a section of the greenway that originally shared space on the road with cars and other traffic, is now safely segregated. However, there remains a 1-mile (2-kilometre) section through Newport town where greenway users share road space with other traffic.

In October 2024, a cycle hub providing accessible tricycles opened in Mulranny.

== See also ==
- Western Way
