= Dooagh =

Dooagh Dumha Acha (Irish)
- Village
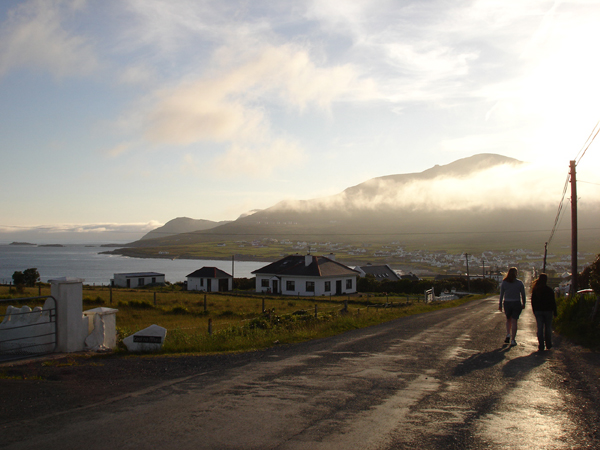
- The road to Dooagh, the westernmost village on Achill Island

- Location in Ireland
- Coordinates: 53.9918954°N 10.0838816°W
- Country: Ireland
- Province: Connacht
- County: County Mayo
- Elevation: 30.6 m (100 ft)

Population (2022)
  - Total: 567

Dooagh (Irish: Dumha Acha) is a village located on Achill Island in County Mayo, Ireland. It is best known for the nearby Keem Bay, a Blue Flag beach.

== Dooagh beach ==
Between May 2017 and January 2019, Dooagh beach had 300 metres (1,000 ft) of golden sand. Previously, the sand was completely washed away in a storm in 1984, leaving a rocky foreshore that remained until the sand was restored by an unusually high tide in April 2017. The new sandy beach was reported as causing an increase in tourism to the village. Dooagh beach washed away for a second time in early 2019.

== Transport ==
=== Road ===
Dooagh is located on the R319 regional road.

Bus Éireann route 450 (Dooagh—Keel—Westport—Murrisk—Louisburgh) serves the village six times daily on weekdays; three times on Sundays. Connections to Ireland West Airport and Dublin are available at Westport

=== Rail ===
The nearest rail services are at Westport railway station, 62 km (39 mi) away. There are several trains a day from Westport to Dublin Heuston via Athlone.

== Facilities ==
Dooagh has a number of bed and breakfast establishments and self-catering apartments. There are two public houses, Lourdie's and Gielty's Bar and Restaurant, which sometimes host traditional Irish music sessions. A now-defunct bar and nightclub, the Wavecrest Hotel, was open seasonally.

== Places of interest ==
The road to the west of Dooagh leads over Croghaun Mountain to Keem Strand, which has views over Clew Bay. A turning off the Keem Road leads to Lough Acorrymore, surrounded by scree slopes and now dammed to supply water for the entire island. The seaward side of Croghaun has high cliffs, the island's highest.

On the road from Dooagh beach towards Lough Corrymore stands Corrymore House, once the home of Captain Charles Boycott, a British land agent whose ostracism by his local community in Ireland as part of a campaign for agrarian tenants' rights in 1880 gave the English language the verb "to boycott", meaning "to ostracise". Captain Boycott moved to Corrymore House after his residence at Keem was burnt down. The American artist Robert Henri also lived there at one time, having bought the house in 1924.

In the centre of Dooagh is a monument to Don Allum, the ocean rower who was the first to row across the Atlantic in both directions, and who completed this feat on reaching Dooagh village near to this point.

== Culture ==
Achill has five pipe bands, Dooagh Pipe Band being one of these. Dooagh Pipe Band was founded on 17 March 1947 with a membership of eleven.

Scoil Acla, an Irish traditional music summer school, takes place annually in Dooagh. Scoil Acla was established in 1910. Artist Paul Henry was an active member of Scoil Acla and in 1912 directed the play Casadh an t-Sugain (The Twisting Of The Rope) by Douglas Hyde. The school gradually went into decline, but was revived in 1985.

== Education ==
Dooagh National School serves the Dooagh, Pollagh and Keel areas, and has 36 pupils and two teachers. The school was built in 1959 and renovated in 2001.

Achill Archaeological Field School is based at the Achill Archaeology Centre in Dooagh. It was founded in 1991 and is a training school for students of archaeology and anthropology. The school is involved in a study of the prehistoric and historic landscape at Slievemore, incorporating a research excavation at a number of sites within the Deserted Village of Slievemore.

== Dooagh Day ==
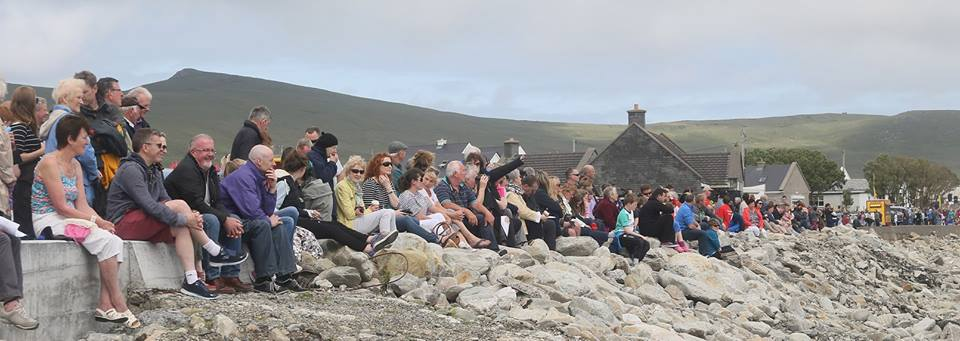
Crowds watch the Currach Races at Dooagh Day 2015

Each July, on the second weekend of the month, the village plays host to a festival which includes traditional Irish currach racing, food, games, music, and an historical exhibition. The first Dooagh Day took place on Sunday 12 July 2015.

== People ==
- Robert Henri (1865–1929), an American artist who came to Achill regularly in the early 20th century. During his early trips to Achill he painted extensively and is reputed to have completed portraits of most of the children in Dooagh village. He bought Corrymore House on the hill above Dooagh in 1924.

== See also ==
- Dooega
