= Sheean, Islandeady =

Townland in County Mayo, Ireland

Coordinates: 53.809°N 9.468°W

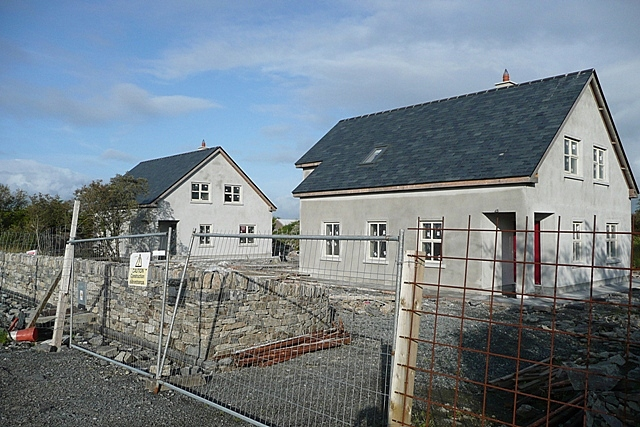
Houses being built at Sheean (2008)

Sheean (from Irish An Sián, meaning 'fairy mound (síodhán)') is a townland in the civil parish of Islandeady, barony of Burrishoole, electoral district of Clogher, in County Mayo, Ireland. The eponymous settlement is located on a hill.

== Geography ==
Located within the civil parish of Islandeady, Sheean is on the N5 road east of Westport, County Mayo. Sheean townland has an area of 0.6 square miles (382 acres, 154 hectares) and borders the townlands of (clockwise from the north) Cogaula, Doon, Dooncastle, Derrygorman, Drummindoo, and Carrownaclea. As of the 2011 census, Sheean townland had a population of 140 people.

Four parishes meet at Sheean – Aughagower, Islandeady, Kilmeena and Westport. Together with several other townlands Sheean forms an exclave of the parish of Islandeady, separated from the larger part by the territory of the parishes of Aghagower and Kilmaclasser.

== History ==
In addition to a cairn and tumulus (barrow) site within Sheean townland, the Record of Monuments and Places records ringfort and enclosure sites in the neighbouring townland of Drummindoo.

== See also ==
- List of towns and villages in the Republic of Ireland
