= Knockroosky =

Townland in Aghagower North, County Mayo, Ireland

Coordinates: 53°47′N 9°27′W

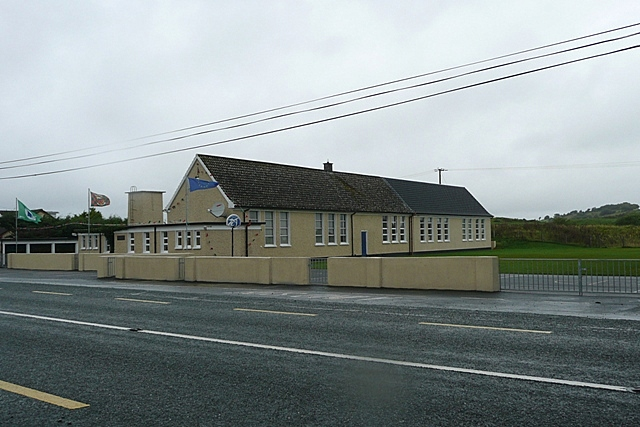
School at Knockroosky

Knockroosky (Irish: Cnoc Rúscaí, meaning 'Hill of the marshy ground') is a townland in the parish of Aughagower and barony of Burrishoole, County Mayo. It is bordered to the west by Ballinvoy, to the northwest by Meneen, to the north by Dooncastle and Cushinkeel, to the northeast by Cushinsheeaun, to the east by Mace North and Mace South, and to the southwest by the Deerpark. All of these are in the parish of Aughagower. The R330 road runs through Knockroosky. The national school for the parish Aughagower is situated to the north of this road.
