= Kilmeena ambush =

Ambush during the Irish War of Independence

- Part of the Irish War of Independence
Date	18 May 1921
Location	Kilmeena, County Mayo 53.843°N 9.529°W
Result	British victory: IRA ambush fails and takes heavy casualties

Belligerents
Irish Republican Army (West Mayo Brigade)	United Kingdom: Royal Irish Constabulary (including Black and Tans)

Commanders and leaders
Michael Kilroy	(United Kingdom) DI Peter Donnellan

Strength
41 volunteers	~20–30 men

Casualties and losses
At least 5 killed At least 4 wounded	3 killed
- Location within island of Ireland

The Kilmeena ambush was an action during the Irish War of Independence that took place at Kilmeena, County Mayo on 19 May 1921. The ambush ended in defeat for the local West Mayo Irish Republican Army (IRA), with five IRA volunteers killed and four wounded and captured. Two members of the Royal Irish Constabulary (RIC) and one Black and Tan were also killed in the action.

== Background ==
The IRA in west Mayo was relatively quiet until January 1921, when Michael Kilroy, described as, "a puritanical and ascetic blacksmith" took over command of the Brigade after Tom Derrig was arrested by the Royal Irish Constabulary. Kilroy formed a relatively large "flying column" of 40–50 men to carry out attacks on Crown forces in the area. On 6 May they suffered a reverse at Islandeady, when a police patrol came upon the IRA men cutting a road; three volunteers were killed and two captured.

== Ambush ==
On 18 May 1921, the IRA decided to attack an RIC/Black and Tan convoy at Kilmeena. Two small-unit attacks were made on the RIC barracks in Newport and Westport to try to draw the police out of their well-defended barracks. One RIC man died in these attacks.

At 3am the next day, 19 May, the column of 41 IRA men took up position close to Knocknabola Bridge. The British convoy, travelling from Newport to Westport, consisted of two Crossley lorries and one Ford touring car—a total of about 30 men. The convoy did not arrive until 3pm and its arrival sparked a two-hour fire-fight. In the battle, one RIC man, Beckett, was wounded and later died. The British regrouped around the house of the parish priest, Father Conroy, and launched a counterattack.

Four IRA volunteers were killed in the engagement. They were Seamus MacEvilly, Thomas O'Donnell, John Patrick Staunton and Sean Collins. A fifth man, Paddy Jordan of the Castlebar battalion was injured and captured, and died later at Bricens Hospital in Dublin. Head RIC Constable Potter was seriously wounded and four more IRA men were wounded. Five IRA members: John Cannon, Paddy Mulloy, Thomas Nolan, Paddy O’Malley and John Pierce are captured.

== Aftermath ==
The remainder of the column, carrying their wounded, fled over the mountains to Skerdagh, where they had safe houses. However, the police tracked them there and, in another exchange of fire, another IRA man was killed, Jim Brown from Newport, along with one RIC Constable and a Black and Tan.

The Black and Tans threw the dead and wounded IRA men on to the street outside the RIC barracks in nearby Westport, causing widespread revulsion among the local people and local police. The Marquis of Sligo, no friend of the republican guerrillas, visited the barracks to complain of their treatment of enemy dead. At the funerals of those killed, in Castlebar, the authorities allowed only close family to attend and forbade the draping of the Irish tricolour over the coffins.

The local IRA blamed their defeat in the ambush on the failure of an IRA unit from Westport to show up in time.

Kilroy's column managed to get some revenge for the setback at Kilmeena the following month (3 June) in an action at Carrowkennedy, where they killed eight policemen and captured 16.
