= Ballydonnellan, County Mayo =

Townland in County Mayo, Ireland

Coordinates: 53.7841°N 9.4866°W

Ballydonnellan (Irish: Baile Uí Dhónalláin) is a townland in the barony of Burrishoole and civil parish of Aughagower, Ireland. It is on the R330 road between Westport and Partry. The townland is bordered to the north by Tonranny and to the northeast by Ardogommon; to the east is Coolloughra; to the south is Shanagh and to the southwest, Derrygarve. To the west is Knockfelim and Moyhastin.
