= Derrygorman =

Townland in Mayo

Coordinates: 53°48′N 9°28′W

Derrygorman (Irish: Doire Mhic Gormáin, meaning 'Mac Gorman's oak wood') is a townland in the civil parish of Aughagower and barony of Murrisk. It is bordered to the north (from east to west) by Drummindoo, and Sheean, to the east by Dooncastle; to the south (from east to west) by Meneen, Ardogommon, and Tonranny; and to the west by Buckwaria and Sheeroe.

During the Irish War of Independence Derrygorman had an Irish Republican Army (1919-1922) Company which was part of 3 Battalion Westport. Thomas Burke of Doon, Sheeaune is listed as Captain, He was arrested in 1921 and imprisoned in the Curragh Internment Camp.
