= Ballinvoy =

Townland in County Mayo, Ireland

Coordinates: 53°47′N 9°28′W

Ballinvoy (Irish: Baile an Mhaí, meaning 'Townland of the Plain') is a townland in the parish of Aughagower and barony of Burrishoole. It is bordered by the following townlands: to the north by Meneen, to the northwest by Ardogommon, to the east by Knockroosky, to the southeast by the Deerpark, to the southwest by Mountbrown, and to the west by Coolloughra. All of these are also in the Parish of Aughagower.
