= Cloondacon =

Townland in County Mayo, Ireland

Coordinates: 53°46′N 9°26′W

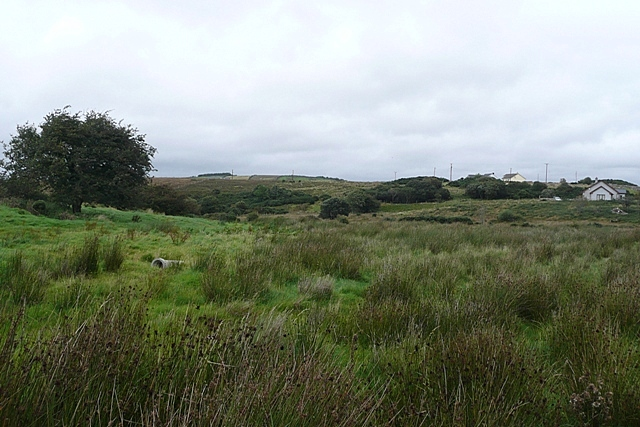
Pasture at Cloondacon

Cloondacon or Cloondachon (Irish: Cluain Dá Chon, meaning 'Meadow of the two hounds') is a townland in County Mayo, Ireland. It is in the parish of Aughagower and the historical Barony of Burrishoole. The townland is bordered to the northeast by Mace South, to the south by Tevinish East, to the southwest by Aughagower, to the west by Gorteen, and to the northwest by the Deerpark.
Cloondacon is situated on Tochar Phádraig, the ancient route from Ballintubber Abbey through Aughagower to Croagh Patrick. The nearest town is Westport, 7 km to the north-west (9 km by road).

The name Cluain Dá Chon refers to an ancient legend according to which a pagan chieftain set two wolfhounds on Saint Patrick. Instead of attacking Patrick, the hounds licked his hands. The chieftain was moved by this and became a Christian. According to an alternative version, St. Patrick made the sign of the cross over them, and the two hounds were swallowed up in an oval shaped hole called Poll na gCon (the hole of the hounds).
