= Ardogommon =

Townland in County Mayo, Ireland

Coordinates: 53°47′19″N 9°28′39″W

Ardogommon (Irish: Ard Ó gComáin) is a townland in the Parish of Aughagower and Barony of Burrishoole. It is bordered to the east by Meneen, to the north, to the southeast by Ballinvoy, to the south by Coolloughra, and to the southwest by Ballydonnellan. All of these are in the Parish of Aughagower. It is also bordered by two townlands in the Parish of Westport: Derrygorman to the north, and Tonranny to the west.
