= Doon Castle =

Ruined castle in County Mayo, Ireland

Coordinates: 53.7968°N 9.4550°W

Doon Castle (Irish: Caisleán an Dúin, meaning 'Fort Castle') was a fortified dwelling situated on a hill in the townland of the same name, in the parish of Aughagower, approximately four miles from Westport in County Mayo.

== History ==
In 1133, Cormac MacCarthy and Conor O'Brien invaded Connaught and plundered much of the country, destroying Dún Mughdhord (Doon Castle) and Dunmore.

The Norman castle of Doon appears to have been built on the site of the old Irish Dún Mughdhord, The castle has almost disappeared. in the townland of Dooncastle. According to local accounts, the stones of the castle were used by Lord Sligo in the building of Westport House.

According to Knox, the MacPhilbins held the castles of Ayle and Aghle and Doon in the Barony of Burrishoole and Bellabourke and the New Castle near Castlebar in the Barony of Carra.

== Situation ==
The castle is on a hill 150 feet in height and gave excellent views to the northeast to Islandeady and Aille, where the other McPhilpin castles were. The space on the hill is in the shape of an ellipse 40-60 yards x 20 yards. The castle was rectangular and measured about 40 feet x 27 feet. The space between the main castle and the outer fortifications was not great.
