= Claddy =

Townland in County Mayo, Ireland

Coordinates: 53°41′51″N 9°32′08″W

Claddy (Irish: An Chláidigh, meaning 'A stony place') is a townland in the civil parish of Aughagower and barony of Murrisk. It is bordered to the northwest by Carrowkennedy, to the north by Bracklagh and Rooghaun, to the northeast by Keelkill and Lackderrig, to the southeast by Derrinke, to the south by Erriff, and to the southwest by Derryilra and Derryherbert. At the time of the Carrowkennedy ambush on 2 June 1921, the West Mayo Flying Column were billeted in the houses of in Claddy.
