= Claggarnagh East, Islandeady =

Townland near Islandeady, County Mayo, Ireland

Coordinates: 53°49′23″N 9°22′33″W

Claggarnagh East (Irish: Clogarnach Thoir) is a townland in the parish & village of Islandeady and the historical barony of Burrishoole, County Mayo. It borders the nearby townlands of Claggarnagh West, Cloonkeen, Annagh. The townland's population has 73 people in 23 occupied dwellings.
