= Battle of Newport (County Mayo) =

Battle during the Irish Civil War

- Part of the Irish Civil War
Date	24–25 November 1922
Location	Newport and environs, County Mayo 53.885°N 9.546°W
Result	Free State victory

Belligerents
Irish Free State	(Irish Republic) Anti-treaty IRA

Commanders and leaders
Anthony Lawlor	Michael Kilroy (POW)

Casualties and losses
5 dead	Michael Kilroy wounded and captured.
- The location of Newport

The Battle of Newport was an engagement in the Irish Civil War. The Free State forces ousted the Republicans from Newport and Michael Kilroy was captured. However, most of the Anti-treaty forces escaped.

== Preparation ==
On 24 November 1922, Brigadier Lawlor with Commandant Generals Simmons and Cooney assembled the troops in Castlebar to prepare an assault on the Republican stronghold of Newport. A priest gave them General Absolution before the battle. The soldiers from Athlone, Ballina, Claremorris and Westport and 'The Big Fella' armoured car left the town. Lawlor sent Captain Joe Ruddy ahead with a company of men to test the defenses on the Westport to Newport Road.

== Battle ==
Ruddy's men came under fire from Michael Kilroy and Republican sentries near Kilbride Cemetery. Ruddy knew the area and sent a junior officer around the hill hoping to encircle the Republicans. Ruddy chased Kilroy up the hill and was killed. Kilroy retreated towards Newport and was wounded in the back by National army soldiers coming up the back of the hill. He was taken prisoner. On the following day, four armoured cars and 400 soldiers crossed the bridge into the centre of the town. The Republicans withdrew westward towards Mulranny.

A unit of National army 'MacEoin's Own' advanced from Crossmolina through Keenagh to Shramore. Six scouts ran into a Republican outpost under Commandant P O'Reilly and were captured. Fighting broke out, and at dark 'MacEoin's Own' fled according to Republicans who captured 6 rifles, and ammunition.

== Casualties ==
There were four more men killed on the National Army side as well as Captain Ruddy. Three were from County Mayo: Vice-Brigadier Joe Walsh, a former member of the West Mayo flying column, who died in hospital; and Volunteers Woods from Westport Quay, P. McEllin of Kiltimagh and Murphy from Galway.
