= Meneen =

Townland in County Mayo

Coordinates: 53°47′N 9°28′W

Meneen (Irish: Méinín, meaning 'a stream') is a townland in the parish of Aughagower in County Mayo, Ireland. It is bordered to the east by the townland of Dooncastle, to the West by the townland of Ardogommon, to the south by the townland of Ballinvoy, and to the southeast by the townland of Knockroosky. To the north is the townland of Derrygorman.
