= Tonragee =

Village in County Mayo, Ireland

Coordinates: 53.953°N 9.858°W

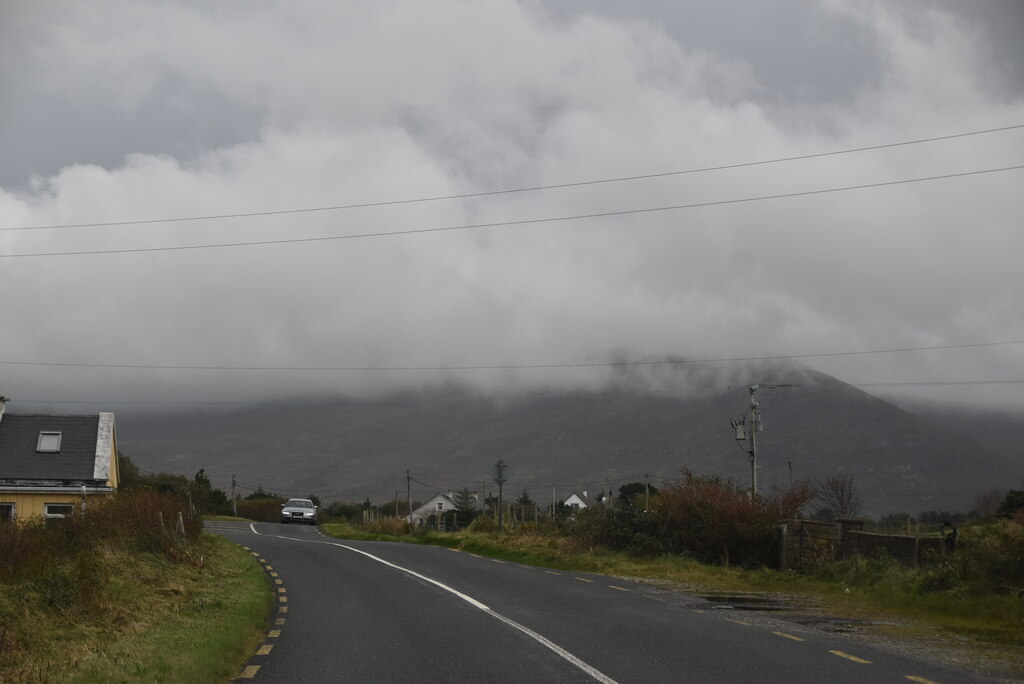
The R319 regional road passing through Tonregee West

Tonragee or Tonregee (Irish: Tóin re Gaoth, meaning 'backside to the wind') is a village on the Currane peninsula in County Mayo, Ireland. The townlands of Tonregee East and Tonregee West are in the civil parish of Achill in the historical barony of Burrishoole. As of the 2011 census, these townlands had a population of 102 and 54 people respectively.

The local national (primary) school, Scoil Náisiúnta Tóin Na Gaoithe (Tonragee National School), had an enrollment of 66 pupils in 2024. The area is also home to a pipe band.

The R319 regional road passes through Tonragee. The Achill Extension Railway, a branch line of the Midland Great Western Railway, previously passed through the area.

== See also ==
- Great Western Greenway
