= Island Eddy =

Island in County Galway, Ireland

Native name: Oileán Eide
- Location within island of Ireland

Geography
- Location: Atlantic Ocean
- Coordinates: 53.2°N 8.99°W
- Highest elevation: 8 m (26 ft)

Administration
- Ireland
- Province: Connacht
- County: Galway

Demographics
- Population: 2 (2022)

Island Eddy is a small, depopulated island at the inner, eastern end of Galway Bay, Ireland.

== Orthography ==
The island is always referred to locally as 'Island Eddy' not 'Eddy Island'. The official Irish Government commission on placenames confirms this usage, giving its Irish and English orthography thus: ‘Oileán Eide / Island Eddy’. It is not to be confused with Islandeady, an inland village and parish in County Mayo.

== Geography ==
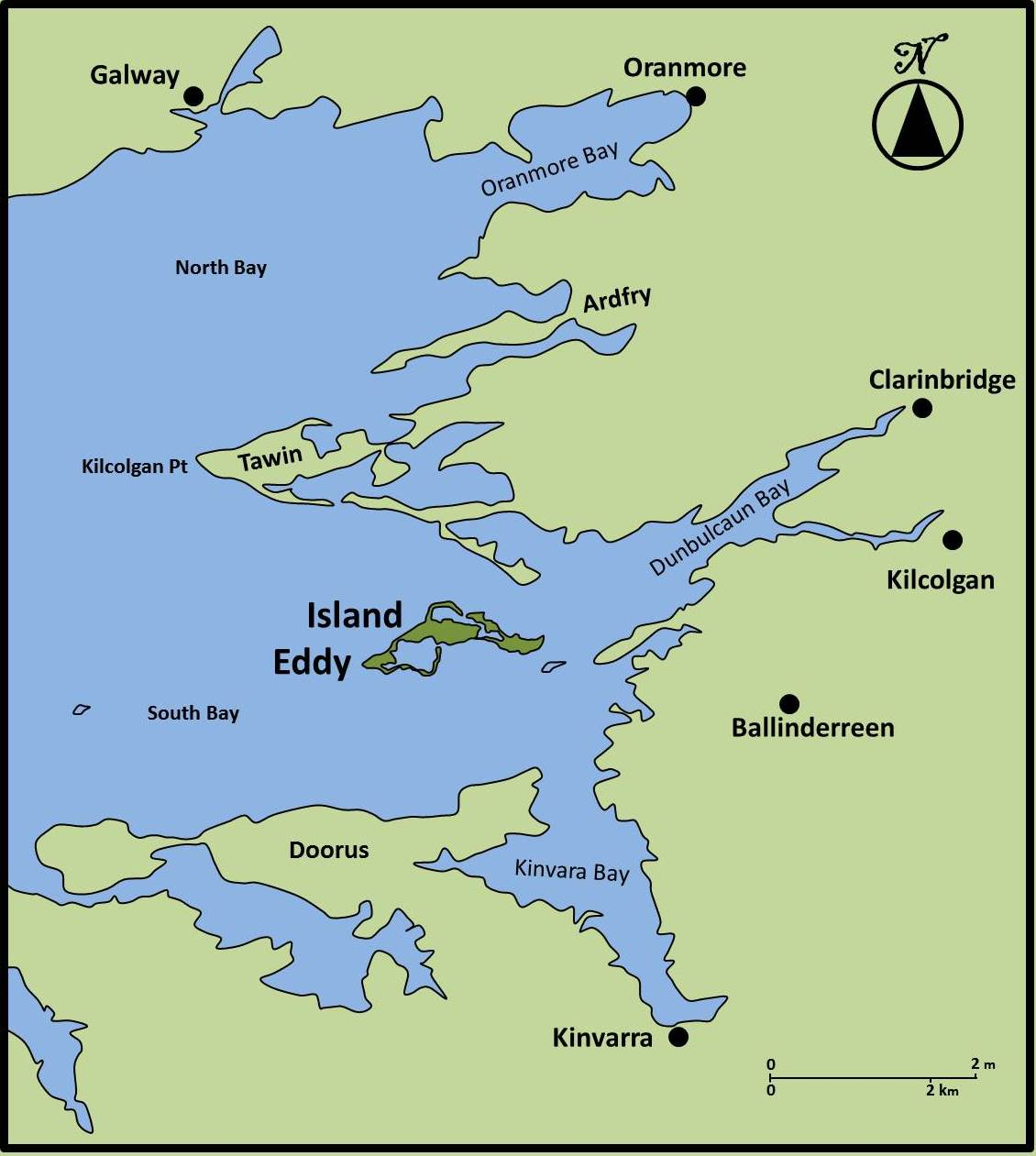
The inner reaches of Galway Bay showing the location of Island Eddy.

=== Location ===
Island Eddy is situated on the inner reaches of Galway Bay on the west coast of Ireland. The nearest town, as the crow flies, is Kinvara, which sits at the head of a shallow inlet some 7 km to the south, south-east.

=== Administration ===
- Townland Name: Island Eddy
- Civil Parish: Drumacoo
- Barony: Dunkellin
- Electoral Division: Drumcoo ED
- County: Galway
- Province: Connacht
- Diocese – historical: Kilmacduagh
- Diocese (R. C.) - modern: Galway, Kilmacduagh & Kilfenora
- Poor Law Union: Galway
- Rural District: 10: Galway
- District electoral division: 043: Ballynacourty

=== Physical geography ===
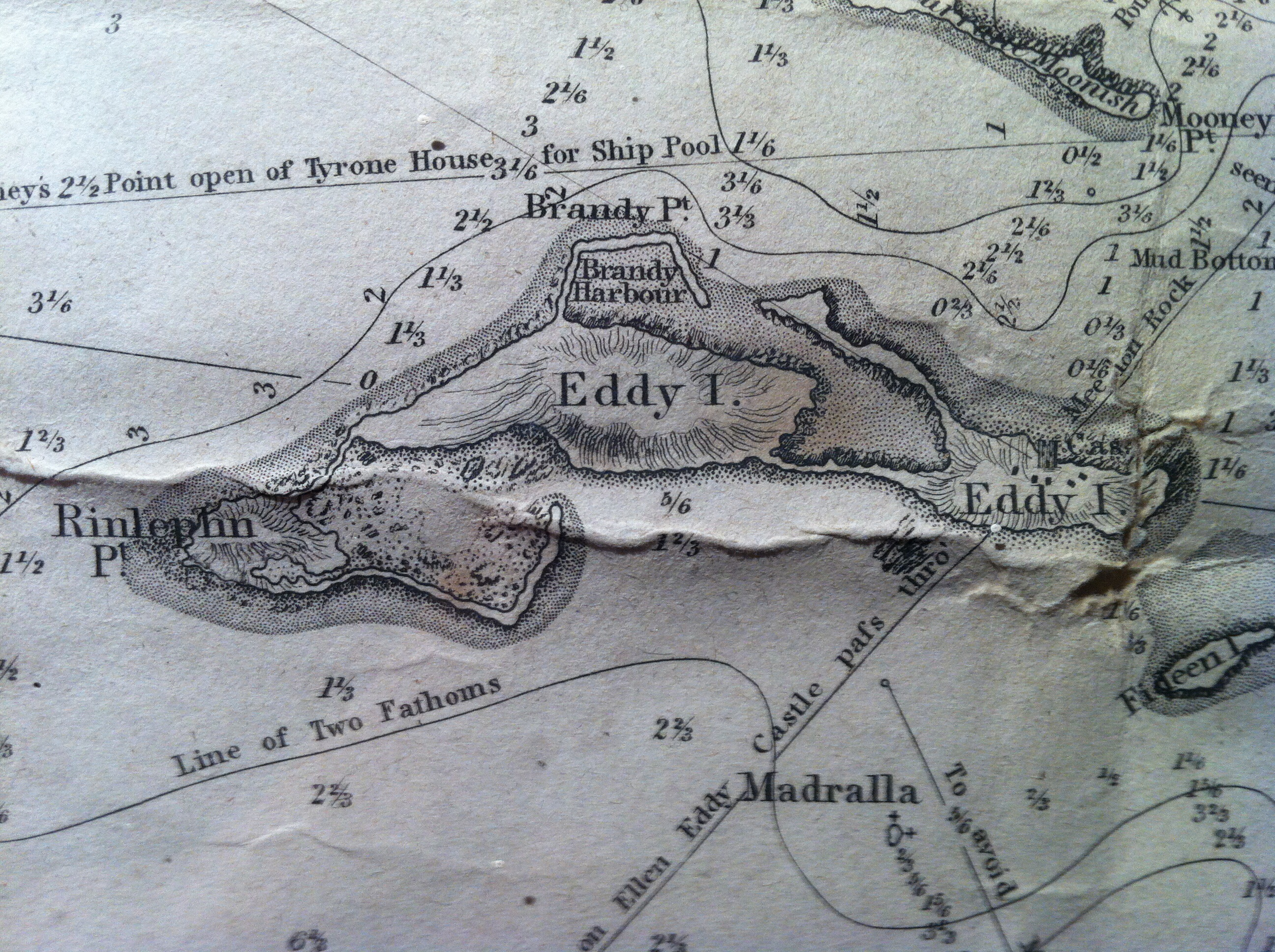
Island Eddy as it appears on Alexander Nimmo's chart of Galway Bay, 1822.

Island Eddy consists of three low islets, inter-linked and flanked by extensive isthmuses and spits. At the south-west end of the island a number of the latter combine to form a large lagoon-like area, and a second series also define another 'lagoon' towards the eastern end. These are known locally as "Malluirs", probably because they fill and drain up to an hour behind the normal tidal pattern. They are labelled as the North Mallmhuir and the South Mallmhuir, respectively. The islets are probably partially submerged drumlins while the isthmuses and spits are largely composed of sea-rolled cobbles and shingle. At the eastern extremity of the island there is a long sinuous sand-spit called "the cush", which allows access to the island by foot at certain spring tides.

In the Books of Survey and Distribution, compiled in the 1650s, 'Illand Edye' is listed as a 'Denomination' of '1/2 of a Qur' comprising '113 0 0 Acres profittable' (Plantation measure).

According to the OS six inches to the mile (1:10,560) scale map the island is '165 Acres, 3 Roods and 24 Perches' (67.14|ha) in extent. Its maximum dimensions are 2.85 kilometres (1.77 mi) long, east to west, and 1.05 kilometres (0.65 mi) wide, north to south. Its maximum elevation is 8 metres (26.25 ft).

=== Maps ===
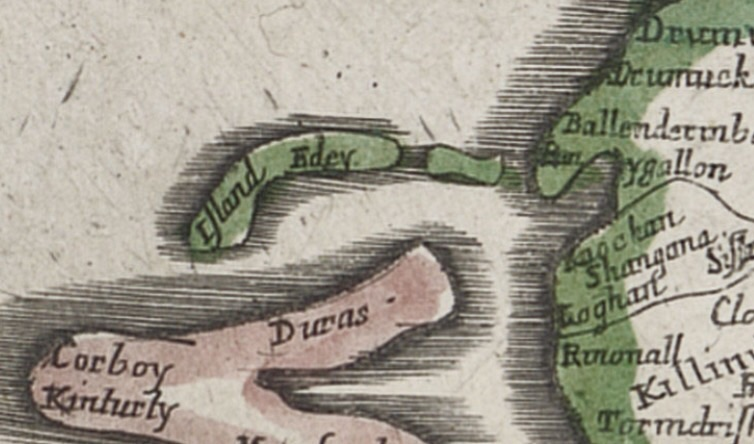
Island Eddy on the Down Survey county map of Galway, 1656–58.

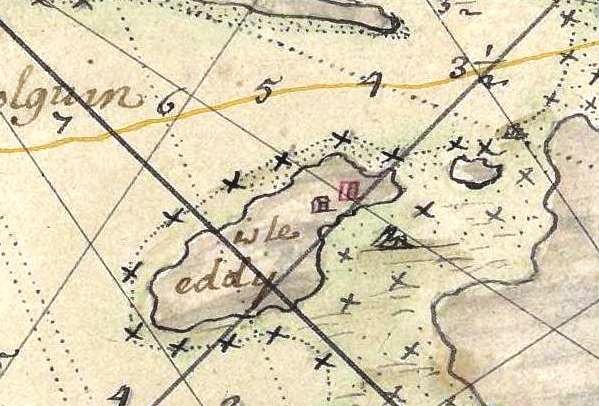
Island Eddy as it appears on a French naval chart of 1690.

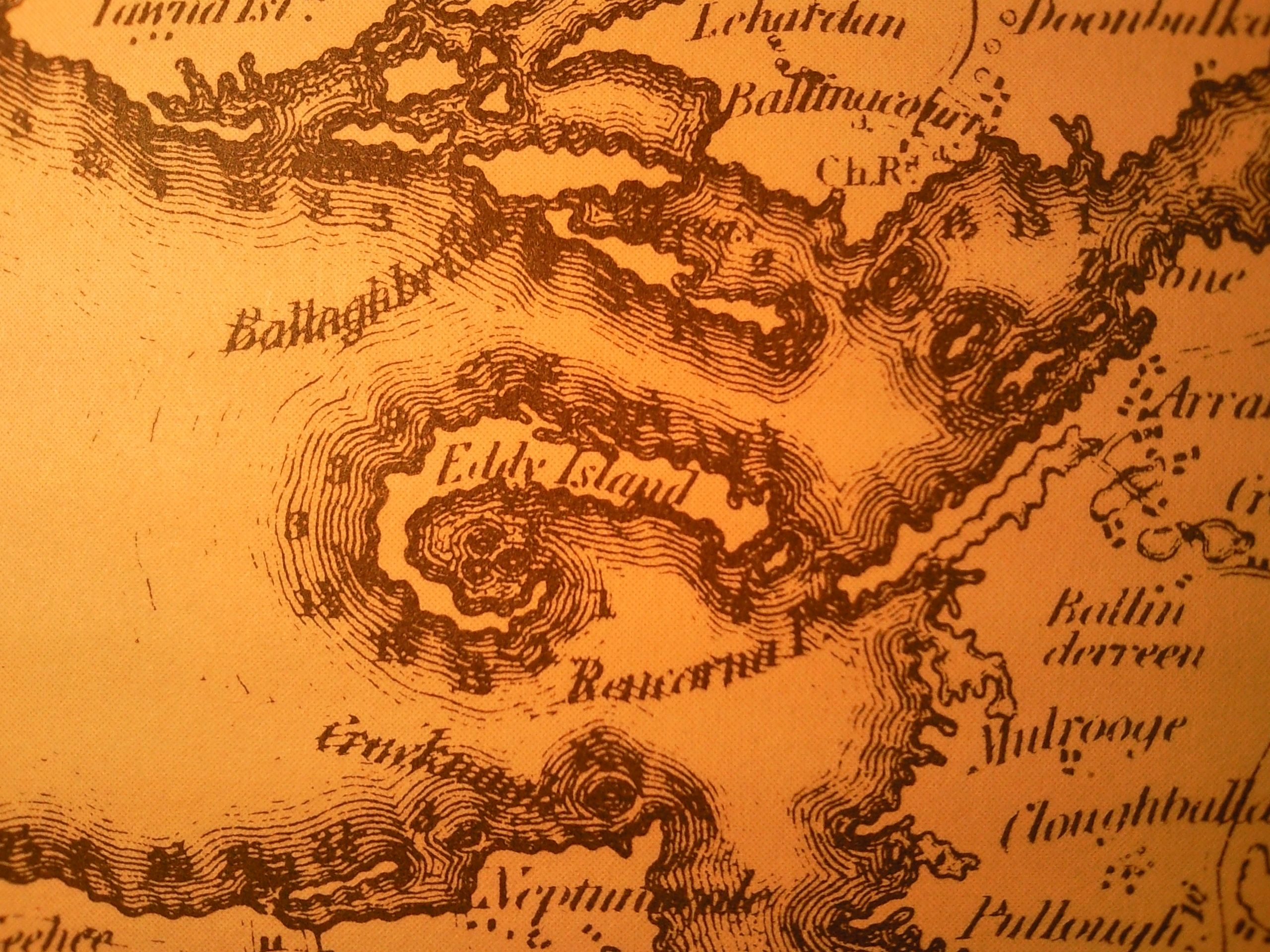
Island Eddy as it appears on Larkin's map of County Galway, 1818.

== Ownership (landlords) ==
1574: Bishop of Kilmacduagh
1641: 'Sr Roebuck Lynch Bart 7/8 of 1/2 Quarter'
1667: 'Dr Robert Gorges'
1855: Sir Thomas N. Redington
Current: the enclosed land and house plots are owned by a number of local mainland families

== Population ==
=== Demographics ===
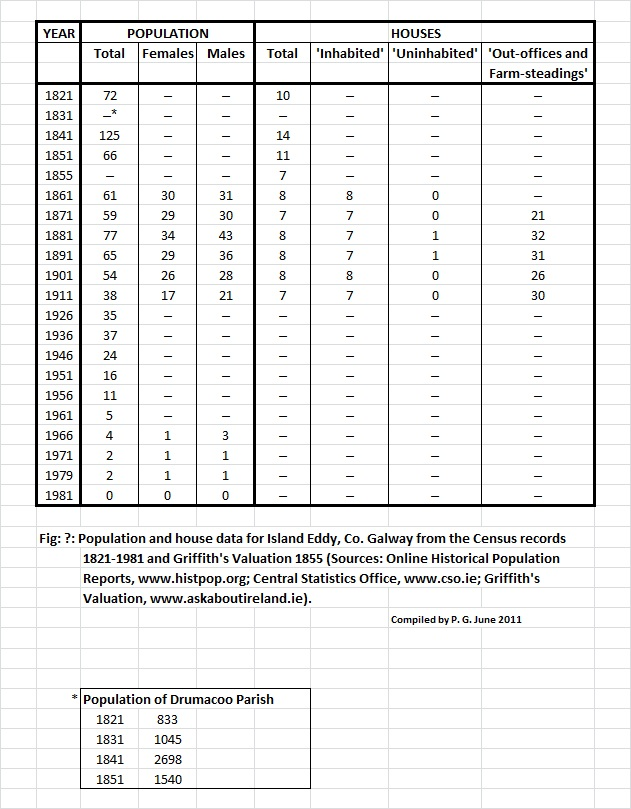
Island Eddy: Tabulated Population & House Data, 1821-1981

Nothing quantifiable is known of the island's population prior to the 19th century. However, the quality of the land and the availability of natural resources (seaweed, shellfish etc.) in the inter-tidal zone suggest that the island is likely to have been an inhabited place from early medieval times if not well before. This is hinted at by the archaeological sources and confirmed by the historical data (see below).

The attached table presents details of the population and house data from the official government census returns, and Griffith's land valuation, between 1821 and 1981. The peak of 125 in the island population in 1841 reflects national trends as does the halving of the community in the following decade due to the Great Famine of 1845–49. Though the population recovered somewhat in the 1870s, it declined steadily in the later 19th and early 20th centuries. Though the closure of the school c.1901, was a major blow, the community remained viable until the eve of the 2nd World War. However, like many islands on the west coast, it went into terminal decline thereafter.

In Oileáin: A guide to the Irish Islands (2004), David Walsh states that Island Eddy was 'abandoned in 1947' but the census returns contradict this. In fact, two people still lived there until early December, 1980.

Historical population

Year	Pop.	±%
1841	125	—
1851	66	−47.2%
1861	61	−7.6%
1871	59	−3.3%
1881	77	+30.5%
1891	65	−15.6%
1901	54	−16.9%
1911	38	−29.6%
1926	35	−7.9%

Year	Pop.	±%
1936	37	+5.7%
1946	24	−35.1%
1951	16	−33.3%
1956	11	−31.2%
1961	5	−54.5%
1966	4	−20.0%
1971	2	−50.0%
1979	2	+0.0%
1981	0	−100.0%

Year	Pop.	±%
1986	0	0.00%
1991	0	0.00%
1996	0	0.00%
2002	0	0.00%
2006	0	0.00%
2011	0	0.00%
2016	0	0.00%
2022	2	—

Source: Central Statistics Office. "CNA17: Population by Off Shore Island, Sex and Year". CSO.ie.

=== Families ===
A number of family names are closely associated with the past two hundred years of the island's history. The principal families in the 19th and 20th centuries were the Berminghams, Conlons, Keanes and Hynes. The Corless family were also part of the community in the early 19th century, and Fitzgeralds and Finnegans feature in the census records for 1901.

The earliest individuals recorded as being of Island Eddy, are 'Richard fitz James Skeret', 'Walter Perrell' and 'Henry Perrell' (presumably the latter's son). They are mentioned in a deed of 1552 concerning the island's castle, Skeret being the owner and the Perrells being the occupiers. The historical sources indicate that the Perrells were associated with Island Eddy for at least four generations from the early 1500s to the 1640s.

In the 1860s, the lessee of the island's oyster beds was a Mr Wray, who described his methods and the success of his venture in some detail in his report to the Deep Sea and Coast Fishery Commissioners. The oyster beds later came into the ownership of the Atlantic Oyster Fisheries Company.

Although the island is no longer populated (the last residents having left in the early 1980s), descendants of former occupants are living, and remain in contact through Facebook and other social media.

== History ==
=== Timeline ===
1. The earliest documentary reference to the island (so far identified) dates from AD 1225. In his Irish Family History;...an historical and genealogical account of the Gaedhals, Richard Cronnelly refers to a raid on 'Hy-Fiachra' by Murtogh O'Brien and the English of Desmond in that year which 'left not a four-footed beast from Island-Eddy to Athenry, or from Tuam to Ectge.'
2. The castle is first recorded in a property deed drawn up in August 1552. Therein, one Richard fitz James Skeret and Walter and Henry Perrell renewed an earlier agreement dated March 1513 concerning property on Island Eddy. The renewal included ‘the house or parte of Castell that belongethe to Richard’. Whether the latter formed part of the earlier agreement is not made clear but the deed represents the earliest solid evidence for the castle's existence.
3. In 1574, 'Iland Eddie' castle was in the sole possession of 'Henry Parell'
4. In 1585, during a commission of enquiry by the English authorities into the causes of feuding among the O'Flahertys of Connemara, a number of witnesses attested that the chief O'Flahertie had an 'anuall rent the some of 3s 4d oute of the Islands of Eddy'.
5. In 1641, 'Illand Edye' is listed as in the possession of 'Sr Roebuck Lynch Bart' and 'Richard Oge Perroll'. Of the '113 0 0 Acres profittable' (Plantation Measure) on the island, the former held 99 acres, the latter 14.
6. In 1780, arising out of an Act "For vesting several lands, tenements and hereditaments in the counties of Galway and Mayo, late the estate of Robert Blake of Ardfry, esquire, deceased, and of Richard Blake his son, deceased, in trustees for sale of a competent part thereof for payment of debts and encumbrances affecting the same, and for settling the residue thereof to and for the several uses, intents and purposes therein mentioned", a man named Joseph Blake (the younger) became 'seized and possessed by Virtue of the Limitations in the said Act' to numerous lands in Counties Galway and Mayo, including "Islandeddy".
7. The OS Name Books, compiled in the late 1830s as part of the Ordnance Survey of Ireland, record the following regarding the island: 'Prop. Thos. Reddington, Esq., M.P., Kilcornan. Agent Mr. O’Flaherty, Inischill. This townland pays £200. Tenants at will. Soil light clay. Produce wheat and oats. There are 24 Tenants appearing very poor. Houses of stone. To the east of the island stands a village called Eddy'.
8. A National School was established on the island in November 1877 by the Redington family of Clarinbridge, the island's landlords. According to the application to the National Schools Board for funding of same, the school comprised a single-roomed thatched building '20 feet (6.1 m) long, 14 feet (4.3 m) broad, 10 feet (3.0 m) high' with an earthen floor. The 'walls are plastered' but the building was 'not ceiled'. A total of 34 students were on the rolls in May 1879, of which 20 were male and 14 female. The first teacher was Kate Madden, aged 19 years. Approval for the payment of the teacher's salary, and for books etc., was given in August 1879. The exact date of the closure of the school is unclear but a number of sources place it c.1901.
9. In 1926–7, the island community was involved in a dispute with local government over the perceived high rate of valuation of the land, resulting in a boycott of rates. Details of this are recorded in The Irish Times and in Dáil Questions Two interesting topographical points emerge from these sources - firstly the statement in the Dáil Questions that the island's valuation 'exceeds the valuation on the best lands in the county'. The second point (in a report by Galway County Council) was that Eddy 'was not a true island'

=== Archaeology ===
1. The most obvious piece of built heritage is the ruined house-cluster, or "village", at the east end of the island. On the 1st edition of the six-inch (1:10,560) scale OS map (1842), this comprised 41 roofed structures (houses and outbuildings) laid out on a rough E-W axis. However, by the time of the 1:2500 scale OS revision (1915–16) considerable changes are evident in the layout of the buildings. The total number of roofed structures is now 36, and the acreage details on the map indicate that they were divided into 7 parcels.
2. The site of the Castle mentioned in 1552 and 1574 (see above under historical snippets) has been located at the eastern end of the village. All that survives is a large stump of masonry in a boundary wall. When the castle was destroyed is unclear but it was still a landmark in the early 1820s when it was included in Alexander Nimmo's maritime survey of Galway Bay. However, it appears to have been reduced to a stump by the time the Ordnance surveyors arrived on the island in the late 1830s as they fail to show it on the OS six inches to the mile (1:10,560) map.
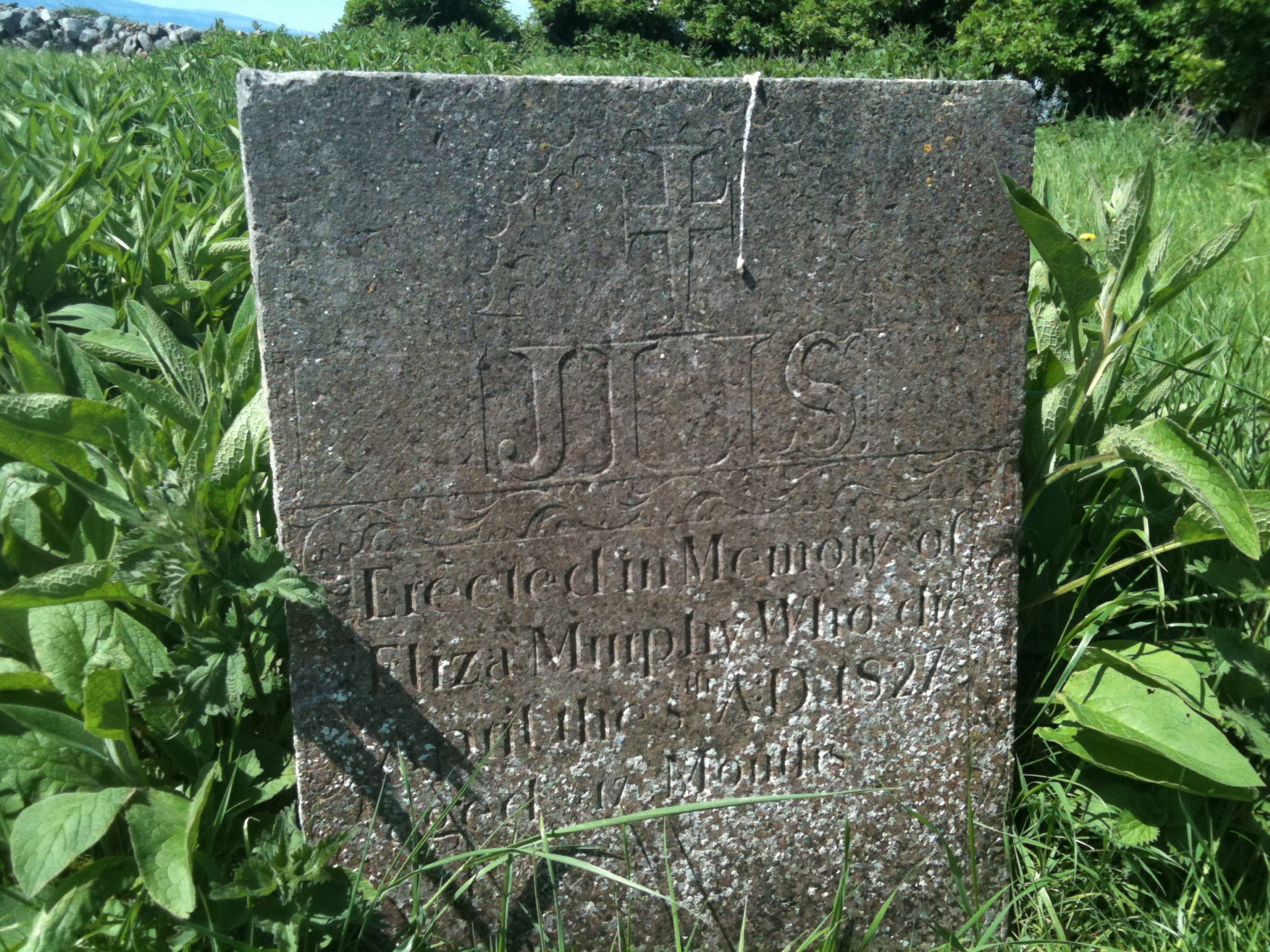
3. Headstone of Eliza Murphy, dated 1827.
  There is also a Children's Burial Ground on the southern limits of the village. It contains one inscribed gravestone, erected in memory of 'Eliza Murphy Who died 8 April AD 1827 aged 17 Months'. This is the subject of a paper in the 2010 issue of the Journal of the Galway Archaeological & Historical Society (JGAHS).
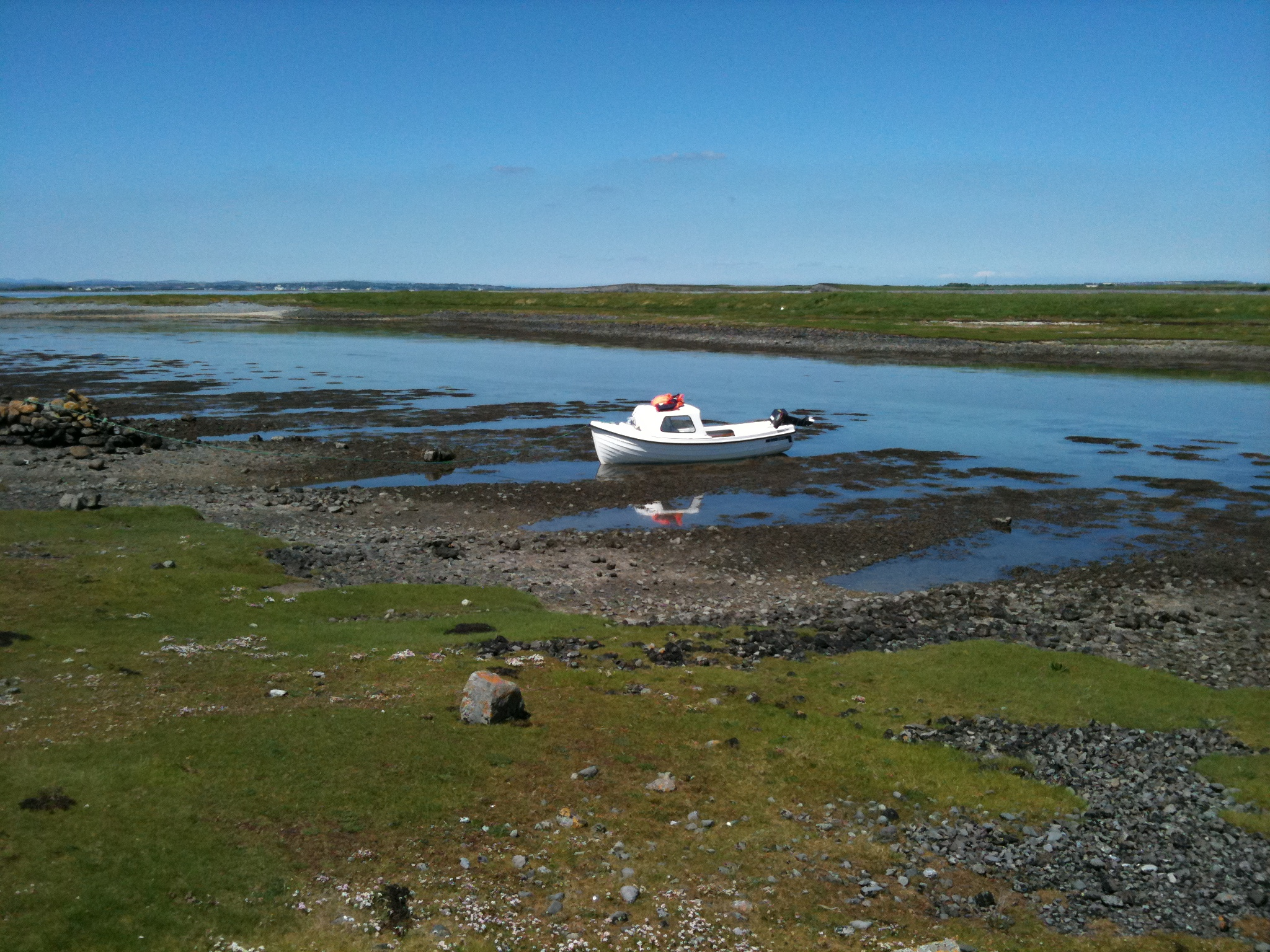
4. View from SE of Nausts no. 6-8 on North Mallmhuir
  An impressive series of boat Nausts have been identified in the North Mallmhuir. A total of 15 definite and one possible nausts are ranged along 115m of shoreline on the south shore of this long narrow inlet. Associated with them are four jetties, numerous mooring posts and a series of ballast dumps. Known locally as 'cloches', they provided safe moorings for the island's fleet of punts, púcáns and bad mórs. A preliminary survey of the nausts was completed in Spring 2010, details of which have been published in Archaeology Ireland. The numbers, scale and layout of the nausts are unparalleled elsewhere in Ireland, making them a unique maritime heritage monument.
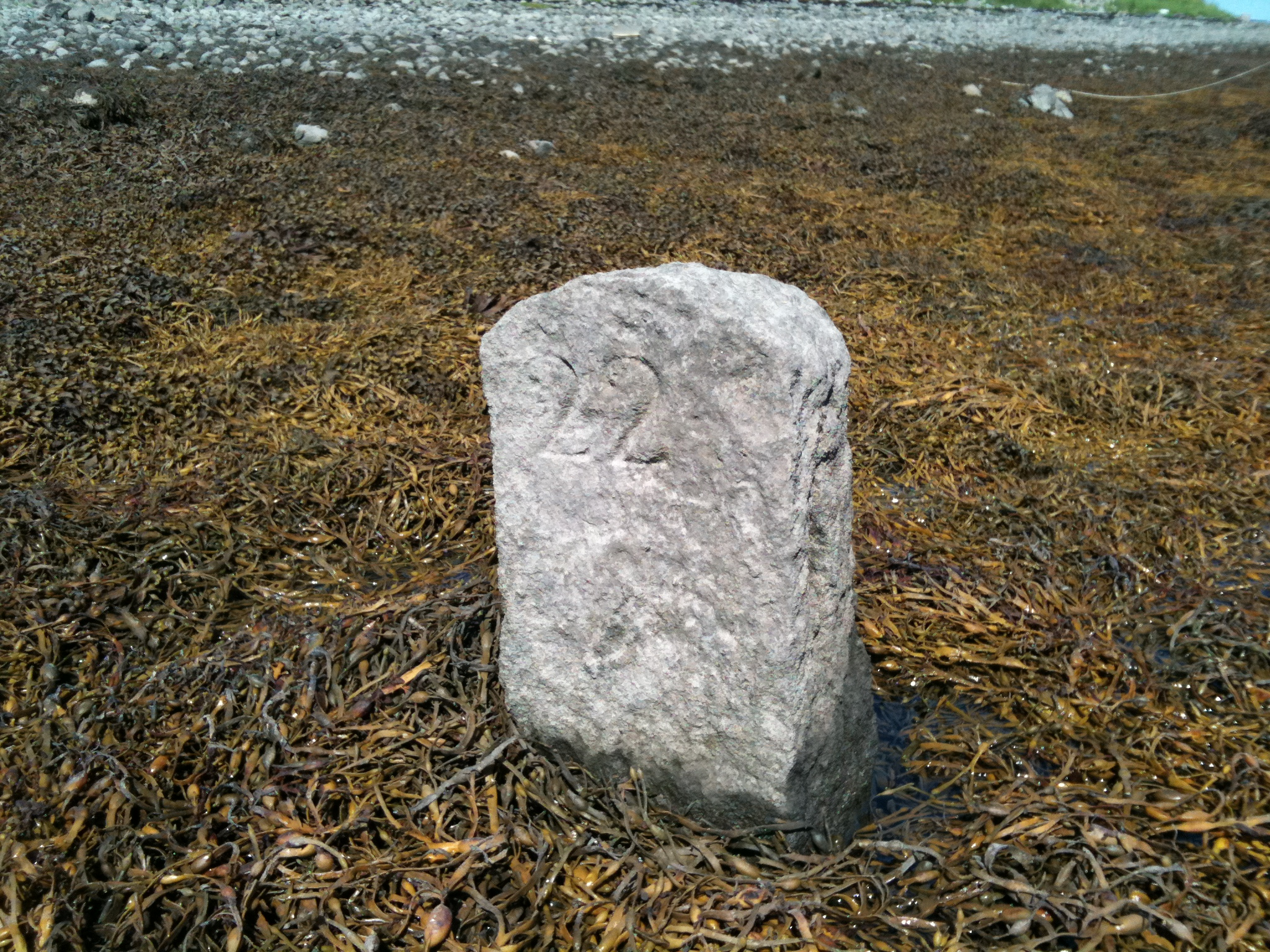
5. Seaweed Mearing Stone bearing the number 22
  A series of numbered seaweed mearing stones exist on the intertidal zone of the South Malluir. Six have been identified in situ to date. Working from west to east they are numbered 23, 22, 21, 9, 10 and 11. A further three examples, all displaced, were identified during fieldwork in 2010 and 2011: these bear the numbers 5, 16 and 20. All the examples consist of long, roughly-dressed rectangular blocks of limestone. The numbers, most finely cut, are placed towards the end of one of the broad faces. They were used to demarcate the valuable seaweed rights and probably date from the late 18th century when the seaweed industry reached a peak. A learned paper on these stones has been published in the Journal of Irish Archaeology in 2013.
6. There is also placename evidence ('cathair') suggesting the former presence of an enclosure of some kind in the central portion of the island.

== Arts ==
The Celtic/folk/acoustic music group called Island Eddy based in Kinvara, County Galway, took their name from the island.

Moya Cannon's collection of poetry, Hands (2011), contains two finely wrought poems relating to Island Eddy - 'Nausts' and 'Eliza Murphy'. Both poems are grounded in the physical particularities of two of the island's most striking monuments, the boat Nausts on the shore of the North Mallmhuir and the Children's Burial Ground on the southern fringes of the village (See Archaeology section, above, for details).

== Nature ==
=== Geology ===
According to the Geological Survey of Ireland, the island's bedrock consists of 'viséan limestone and calcareous shale'

Very little bedrock is actually exposed on the ground surface, save at the western tip. The long, low, drumlin-like ridge which forms the heart of the island appears to be composed mainly of glacial drift which was probably laid down during the last ice age. The same is probably true of the two smaller hillocks to the east and west of it. In contrast, the sinuous isthmuses and spits which link them are composed of sea-sorted sand, shingles and cobbles. These are of post-glacial origin and it is clear that they are being continuously moulded by tidal currents.

=== Flora ===
Island Eddy lies within area H15: South-east Galway, of the vice-county system for recording flora in Ireland.

A comprehensive field survey of the island's vegetation has been undertaken by Messrs. Roden and Sheehy Skeffington and is forthcoming in The Irish Naturalists Journal.

=== Fauna ===
1. Sheep and Horse are grazed on the island fields.
2. Otter has been identified, and at least one holt located.
3. There also appear to be numerous rats, particularly along the south-facing shorelines.
4. A bat survey was conducted in the vicinity of the abandoned village on 21 June 2010, using a Pettersson D100 Heterodyne Bat Detector. A single Common Pipistrelle (Pipistrellus pipistrellus) was detected foraging around the village but its roost was not located.
5. Hares are present but the exact size of the population is unknown. In the recent past they have been trapped and removed from the island for hare-coursing. This is done under government licence, a condition of which is that a similar number of hares are released back onto the island (weather permitting) after coursing has taken place.
6. A pair of young rabbits were sighted in June 2010.

== The Discursive Survey of Island Eddy ==
An interdisciplinary group set up in 2008 by Drs. Roden & Springer (then of Carrowgarrif) carried out The Discursive Survey of Island Eddy; those who participated were mainly local residents of the south Galway littoral with a knowledge of the island and an interest and/or expertise in the natural and human sciences.

An introduction to the aspirations and approaches of the Survey can be found in the Autumn 2010 issue of Archaeology Ireland. The Survey has not received funding of any kind to date. Leo Hallisey, the organiser of Connemara Sea-Week, wrote:

To see people dedicate time to a study like this just for the love of their work is an amazing concept in this day and age, when everything is so driven by money. It's old-fashioned scholarship at its very best'.

Research to date has been conducted on the following: Terrestrial Vegetation, the Castle, the Children's Burial Ground, the Nausts and the Seaweed Mearing Stones and these topics have inspired a number of artistic responses - see below for publication details.

The subject of maritime history is under active investigation (July 2015).

The following topics have been identified as worthy of investigation but await committed researchers: Lagoons, Vegetation & Ecology of the Salt Marshes, Cottage Garden Plants & Herbs, Terrestrial Fauna, Birds, Moths, Placenames, Social & Family History, the Architecture and Layout of the House Cluster, Ownership History, Poetry, Folklore, Poetry and Music.

Members of the Survey have presented results of their work individually in public lectures and collectively at a half-day symposium in Letterfrack, in October 2012, during Connemara Sea-Week.
