= Achill railway station =

Former railway station in Ireland

Achill Acaill, Oileán Acla
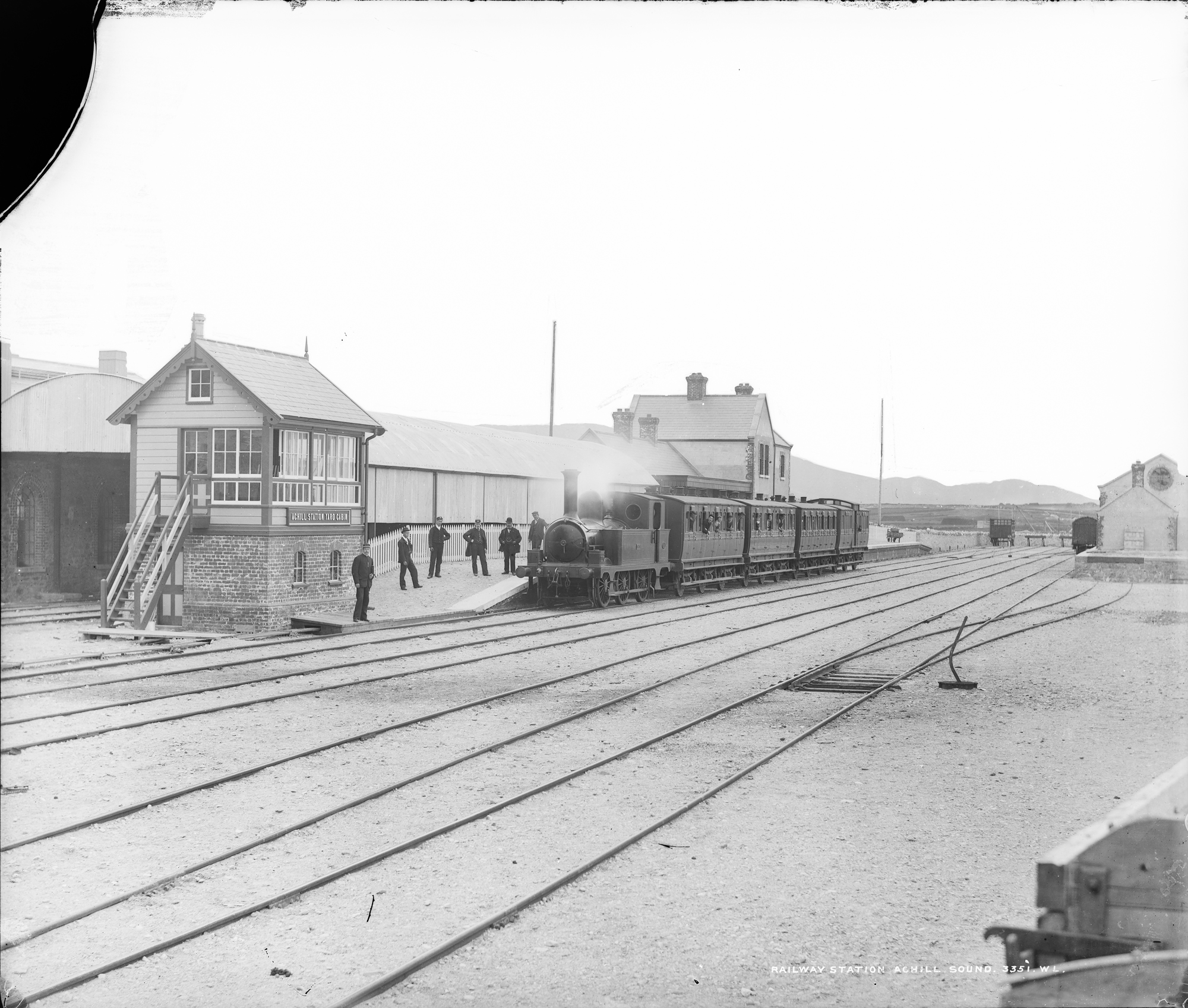
- Achill Railway station in the early 20th century

General information
- Location: Achill Sound, County Mayo; Ireland
- Coordinates: 53°56′03″N 9°55′06″W
- Distance: 27 miles to Westport

History
- Opened: 1895
- Closed: 1937
- Original company: Midland Great Western Railway

Key dates
- 18 May 1895: Station opens
- 31 December 1934: Station closes to passenger traffic, becomes freight only
- 20 May 1936: Station reopens fully to passenger traffic
- 1 October 1937: Station closes
Location

Achill station served Achill in County Mayo, Ireland and was the terminus of the line which connected to Westport via Mallaranny (Mulranny) and Newport.

== History ==
It was opened by the Midland Great Western Railway in 1895, which was amalgamated into the Great Southern Railway in 1924, and closed in 1937.

The station is now a hostel and the route to Westport was used for the Great Western Greenway trail.

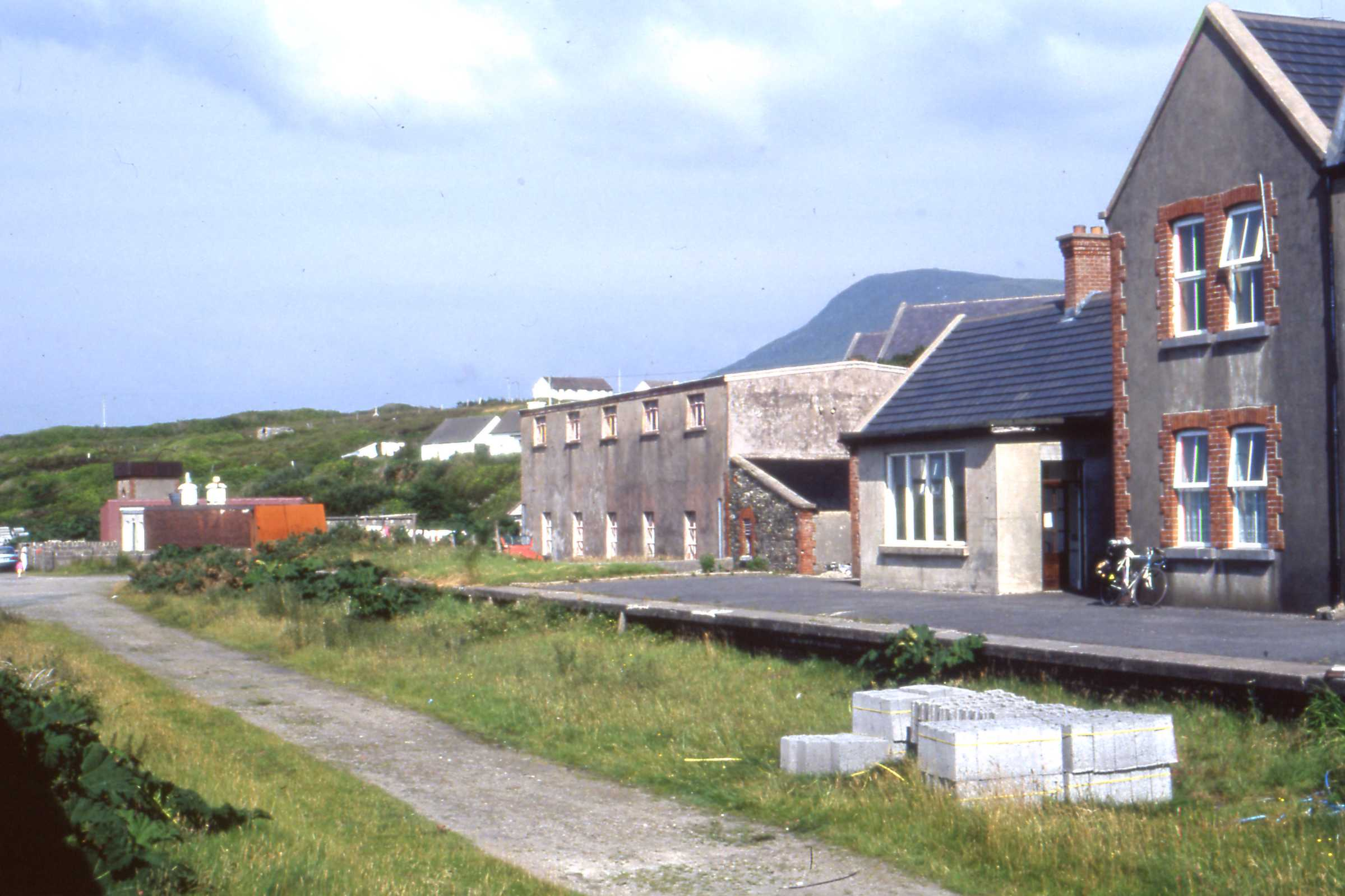
Achill station circa 1994

Preceding station	Disused railways	Following station
Mallaranny (Mulranny)	Midland Great Western Railway; Westport-Achill	Terminus
