= Cogaula =

Townland in County Mayo, Ireland

Coordinates: 53.8183°N 9.4650°W

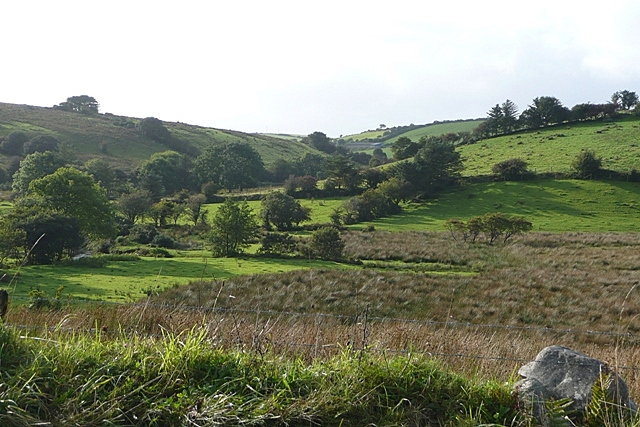
Farmland in Cogaula

Cogaula (Irish: Cagála) is a townland in the civil parish of Islandeady, County Mayo, Ireland. The townland has an area of approximately 1.5 square kilometres (0.58 sq mi), and had a population of 74 people as of the 2011 census.

The local national (primary) school, Cogaula National School, is approximately six kilometres (3.7 mi) east of Westport, and had 36 pupils enrolled as of 2011.
