= Seven Arches Bridge (Newport) =

Historic bridge in County Mayo, Ireland

Coordinates: 53.8843°N 9.5449°W

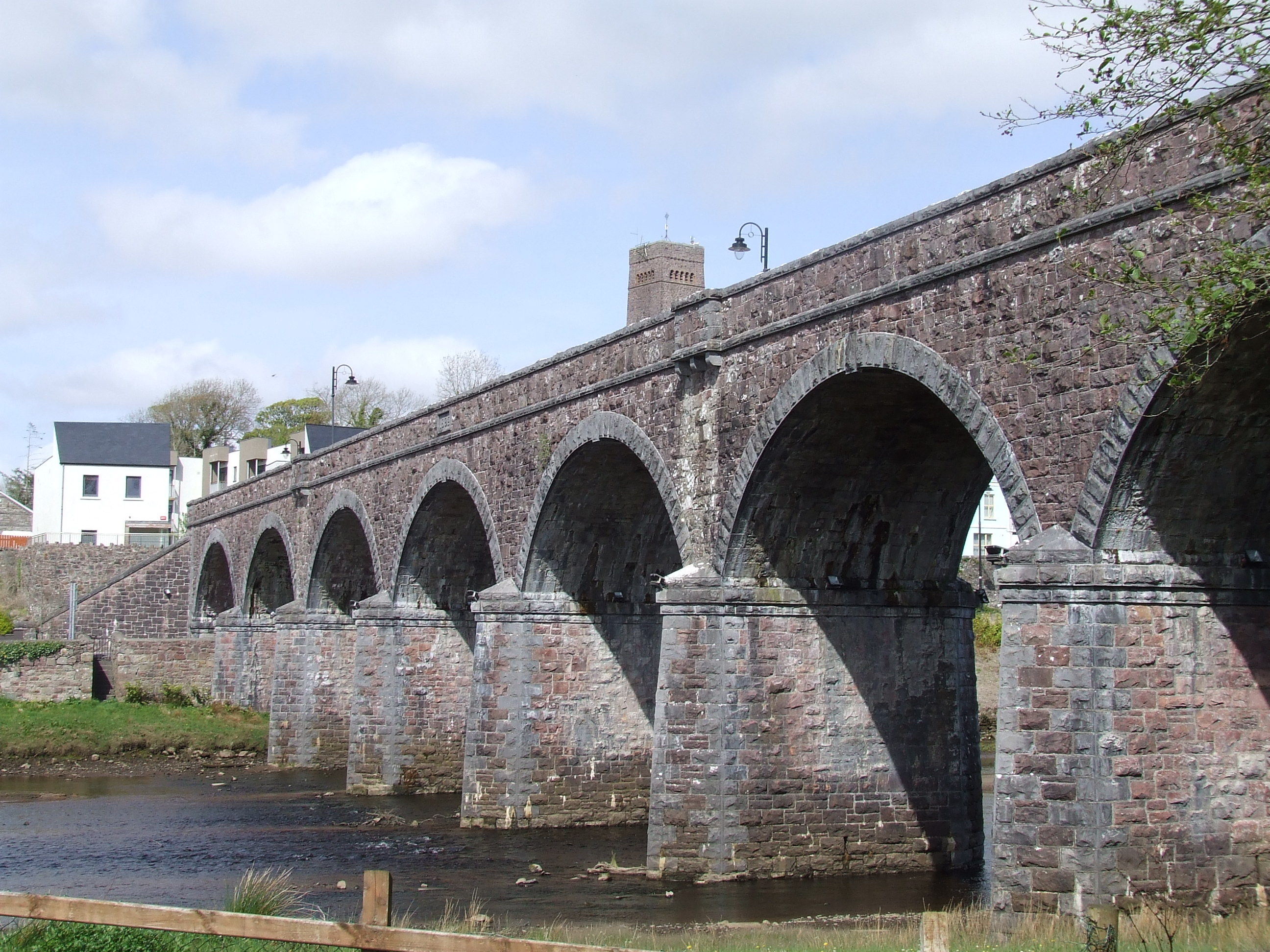
The bridge in 2011.

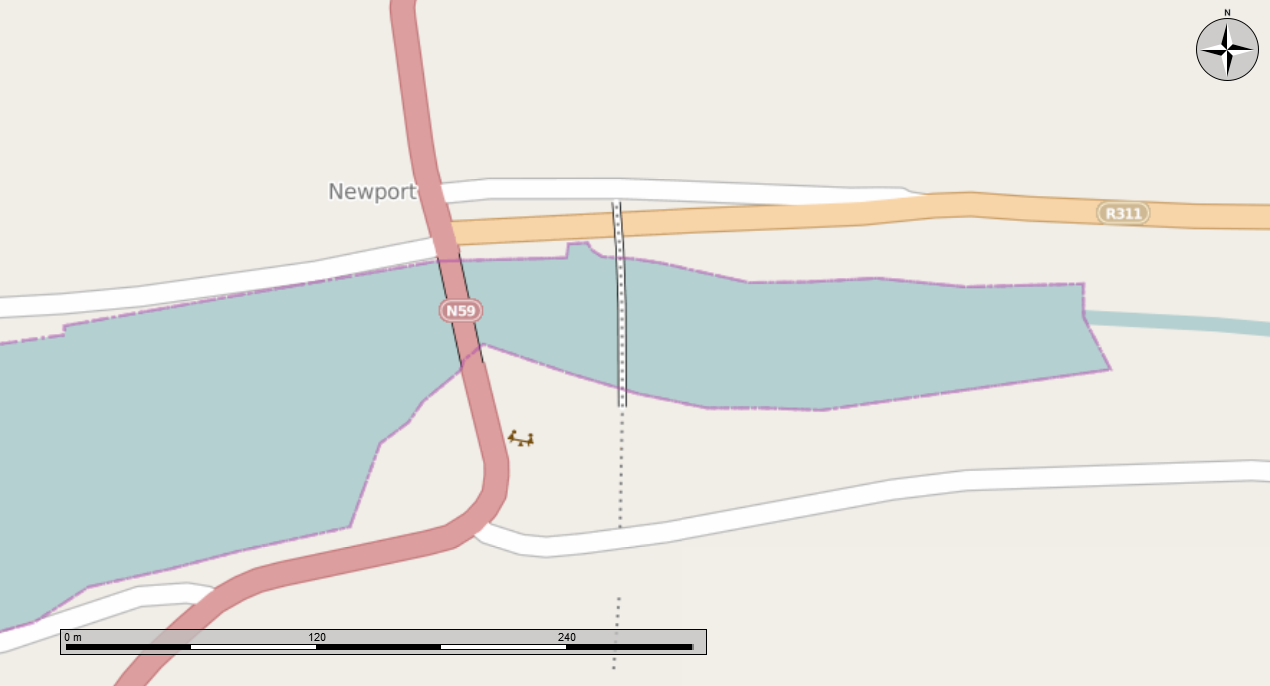
Map showing the bridge.

The Seven Arches Bridge is a historic bridge in Newport, County Mayo, Ireland.

Built around 1892, the bridge is a seven span squared red sandstone structure with limestone detailing over the Black Oak River/Newport River. It carried the Achill branch of the Midland Great Western Railway line, with the last train running on this line in the autumn of 1937. It was recently restored as part of the Great Western Greenway, the longest off-road cycling & walking route in Ireland.

The bridge is listed as number 112 on the Record of Protected Structures for County Mayo.

== Technical Details ==
The single track viaduct has an overall length of 305 feet (93 m) and width 18 ft 6 in (5.64 m). The seven segmental arches have a 37-foot (11 m) span, with a rise of 12 ft 6 in (3.81 m). The arch rings are 24 inches thick (61 cm). The bridge piers are 6 ft (1.8 m) thick with pointed cutwaters. The cost of the viaduct was over £7,000.

The rail line over the viaduct was not opened until 1894 pending completion of a nearby tunnel.
