= Michael Kilroy =

Irish republican and politician (1884–1962)

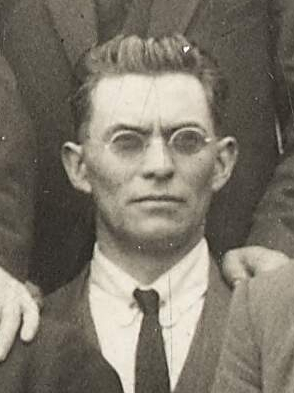
- Kilroy in 1927

Teachta Dála
- In office August 1923 – July 1937
- Constituency: Mayo South

Personal details
- Born: 14 September 1884 Newport, County Mayo, Ireland
- Died: 23 December 1962 (aged 78) Newport, County Mayo, Ireland
- Party: Sinn Féin; Fianna Fáil

Military service
- Branch/service: Irish Republican Army; Anti-Treaty IRA
- Battles/wars: Irish War of Independence; Kilmeena ambush; Carrowkennedy ambush; Irish Civil War; Battle of Newport (POW)

Michael Kilroy (14 September 1884 – 23 December 1962) was an Irish republican and politician. He was an Irish Republican Army (IRA) officer in his native County Mayo during the Irish War of Independence and Irish Civil War. Subsequently, he was a Sinn Féin and later Fianna Fáil Teachta Dála (TD) for Mayo South.

== Early life ==
Kilroy was born in Derrylahan townland, Newport, County Mayo on 14 September 1884. He was the son of Edward and Matilda Kilroy and one of ten in the family. He was a carpenter and coachbuilder and learned his trade in Claremorris when he was 16 years and lodged with the Stratford Family in Mount Street, Claremorris. He was married to Ann Leonard of Crossmolina and they had eight in family. As a child he was raised with his maternal grandmother who was also Kilroy in the townland of Carrickaneady, Newport and went to school in Culmore in the 1890s. He set up his own business in Newport.

== Guerrilla leader and hunger striker ==
In 1913 Richard Walsh from Balla, County Mayo and Kilroy were the main organizers of the Irish Republican Brotherhood (IRB) in south and western Mayo. In his earlier career with the Movement for Independence, Kilroy was one of the founder members of the Volunteer Company in Newport in February 1914. He was also the Officer commanding (O/C) and quartermaster of the Mayo Brigade of the Irish Volunteers.

The IRA in West Mayo was relatively quiet until January 1921, when Michael Kilroy, who was described as, "a puritanical and ascetic blacksmith" took over command of the brigade after the previous leader Thomas Derrig was arrested by the British.

There were four battalions in the West Mayo Brigade: the First Battalion was in Castlebar, the Second Battalion was in Newport, the Third Battalion was in Westport and the Fourth Battalion was in Louisburgh. Kilroy formed a flying column of 40–50 men to carry out attacks on British forces in the area.

On 22 March 1921 Kilroy and two comrades, Joe Ring and Brodie Malone Armed with a Mauser revolver chanced upon a sergeant and three constables of a Royal Irish Constabulary (RIC) patrol beside Westport road near Carrowkennedy. Only the width of the road separated the fighters. Michael Kilroy injured Sergeant Coughlan who died later. Three of the policemen surrendered. On 6 May 1921, they suffered a reverse at Islandeady, when a British patrol came upon the IRA men cutting a road. Three IRA members were killed and two captured.

Another setback was to follow at the Kilmeena ambush on 19 May 1921, where six IRA men were killed and seven wounded. One RIC policeman and one Black and Tans were also killed in the action. After the ambush at Kilmeena the column retreated to the hill country of Skirdagh to the north-east of Newport. On 23 May 1921, they were forced to retreat when a patrol from Newport came into the village, but the men of the West Mayo Brigade held them off and the wounded were got away to safety. The column was hidden in the hills of the Nephin range and in the Glenisland area until the RIC, Tans and the Border Regiment lifted the cordon. One volunteer, Jim Browne from Drumgarve, Kilmeena, was killed at Skirdagh and a number of the RIC, including a district inspector, died. It was a crucial week in the survival of the column because they were attacked from the rear at Kilmeena and could have been wiped out during this action.

The Crown forces burned houses, including the home of Michael Kilroy, on 20 May 1921 and the same would happen after the Carrowkennedy Ambush in June 1921. The south-west Mayo area suffered greatly during these months of 1921 due to ambushes.

On 2 June 1921, in an action at Carrowkennedy, eight Tans were killed and 16 members of the RIC, along with a Lewis Machine gun, rifles and ammunition, were taken. The ambush began after the convoy or patrol left Darby Hastings' pub at Carrowkennedy. James 'Jimmy' O'Flaherty of the column fired early hitting the driver of the first vehicle, and after a protracted period of firing in which a number of Tans were killed an explosion in one of the lorries brought an end to the attack. Two of the wounded Tans died later. The 16 RIC men surrendered in a nearby cottage. The first casualty in the ambush was District Inspector Stevenson.

Kilroy opposed the Anglo-Irish Treaty in 1922 and sided with the Anti-Treaty IRA during the Civil War with the Irish Free State forces in 1922–23. In April 1922 he served on the Army Executive of the IRA in this period. In October 1922, he was appointed O/C of the 4th Western Division and later the Western Command in September 1922. The 4th Western Division covered North Mayo, West Mayo and West Connemara.

In the early months of the Civil War, he and his men dominated the West Mayo area and successfully ambushed Free State Army troops on several occasions. The government forces also had to evacuate their garrison at Newport. Kilroy also carried out a successful attack on Clifden, capturing the army post there on 29 October 1922. His men also captured Ballina, County Mayo on 12 September 1922 capturing 100 rifles and 20,000 rounds of ammunition. Kilroy was said to have had three armored cars built and was possibly working on the construction of trench mortars. In addition, he oversaw a "factory" which produced bombs and mines. They fought a battle at Glenamoy on 16 September 1922, where six Free State troops were killed and five wounded; one republican officer was wounded.

However, the Free State then sent an expedition to the North Mayo/Connemara area, which succeeded, after some fighting, in capturing Kilroy and many of his men at Carrowbeg House on 23 November 1922. Kilroy was badly wounded and interned at Athlone and Mountjoy Prison, where he went on hunger strike and from which he later escaped in late 1923 when the struggle was over. Kilroy was the leader of the Mounjoy internees during the 1923 Irish Hunger Strikes and made the position of the prisoners clear: "Each of us, to himself and his comrades, solemnly pledges to refrain from food until he is unconditionally released. In taking this grave decision we, as citizens of Ireland, know that lovers of human liberty the world over will understand and respect our decision. Our lives and the suffering we shall endure we offer to God for the furtherance of the cause of truth and justice in every land and for the speeding of the day of Irelands freedom." The hunger strike was called off on 23 November 1923. Kilroy ensured that messages were sent from Kilmainham Gaol to each prison stating that all internees would end the strike together.

== Politician ==
Kilroy entered politics in August 1923 while still in prison. He was elected for the Republicans for Mayo South but did not take his seat in the 4th Dáil due to Sinn Féin's abstentionist policy.

He was elected as a Fianna Fáil TD in Mayo South at the June 1927 general election. He was re-elected at the September 1927, 1932 and 1933 general elections. He lost his seat at the 1937 general election. when contesting the general election in Mayo North.

He was the Chairman of Mayo County Council from 1934 to 1945, the longest-serving member in this position in the history of the council. He retired from politics in 1945. From 1945 until his death on 23 December 1962 he was a Member of the Hospitals Commission. His funeral was one of the largest seen in Newport and along with many politicians, the then President Éamon de Valera was present. The graveside oration was given by his comrade and fellow TD Edward Moane from Westport.

The Fianna Fáil Cumann in Newport is named in his honour and his son Peadar also was in local politics as a member of Mayo County Council. A booklet on the life of Michael Kilroy was published in 2008, Michael Kilroy – A Life 1884 – 1962.

Dáil	Election	Deputy (Party)	Deputy (Party)	Deputy (Party)	Deputy (Party)	Deputy (Party)
4th	1923	Tom Maguire (Rep)	Michael Kilroy (Rep)	William Sears (CnaG)	Joseph MacBride (CnaG)	Martin Nally (CnaG)
5th	1927 (Jun)	Thomas J. O'Connell (Lab)	Michael Kilroy (FF)	Eugene Mullen (FF)	James FitzGerald-Kenney (CnaG)	Martin Nally (CnaG)
6th	1927 (Sep)	Thomas J. O'Connell (Lab)	Michael Kilroy (FF)	Richard Walsh (FF)	James FitzGerald-Kenney (CnaG)	Martin Nally (CnaG)
7th	1932	Edward Moane (FF)	Michael Kilroy (FF)	Richard Walsh (FF)	James FitzGerald-Kenney (CnaG)	Martin Nally (CnaG)
8th	1933	Edward Moane (FF)	Michael Kilroy (FF)	Richard Walsh (FF)	James FitzGerald-Kenney (CnaG)	Martin Nally (CnaG)
9th	1937	Edward Moane (FF)	Micheál Clery (FF)	Richard Walsh (FF)	James FitzGerald-Kenney (FG)	Martin Nally (FG)
10th	1938	Mícheál Ó Móráin (FF)	Micheál Clery (FF)	Richard Walsh (FF)	James FitzGerald-Kenney (FG)	Martin Nally (FG)
11th	1943	Mícheál Ó Móráin (FF)	Micheál Clery (FF)	Joseph Blowick (CnaT)	James FitzGerald-Kenney (FG)	Dominick Cafferky (CnaT)
12th	1944	Mícheál Ó Móráin (FF)	Micheál Clery (FF)	Joseph Blowick (CnaT)	Richard Walsh (FF)	Dominick Cafferky (CnaT)
12th	1945 by-election	Mícheál Ó Móráin (FF)	Bernard Commons (CnaT)	Joseph Blowick (CnaT)	Richard Walsh (FF)	Dominick Cafferky (CnaT)
13th	1948	Mícheál Ó Móráin (FF)	Bernard Commons (CnaT)	Joseph Blowick (CnaT)	Richard Walsh (FF)	4 seats 1948–1969
14th	1951	Mícheál Ó Móráin (FF)	Seán Flanagan (FF)	Joseph Blowick (CnaT)	Dominick Cafferky (CnaT)	4 seats 1948–1969
15th	1954	Mícheál Ó Móráin (FF)	Seán Flanagan (FF)	Joseph Blowick (CnaT)	Henry Kenny (FG)	4 seats 1948–1969
16th	1957	Mícheál Ó Móráin (FF)	Seán Flanagan (FF)	Joseph Blowick (CnaT)	Henry Kenny (FG)	4 seats 1948–1969
17th	1961	Mícheál Ó Móráin (FF)	Seán Flanagan (FF)	Joseph Blowick (CnaT)	Henry Kenny (FG)	4 seats 1948–1969
18th	1965	Mícheál Ó Móráin (FF)	Seán Flanagan (FF)	Michael Lyons (FG)	Henry Kenny (FG)	4 seats 1948–1969
19th	1969	Constituency abolished. See Mayo East and Mayo West				
