= Carrowkennedy ambush =

1921 IRA ambush

- Part of the Irish War of Independence
Date	2 June 1921
Location	Carrowkennedy, County Mayo, Ireland 53.710°N 9.561°W
Result	Irish victory

Belligerents
Irish Republican Army	(United Kingdom of Great Britain and Ireland) Royal Irish Constabulary; Black and Tans

Commanders and leaders
Michael Kilroy	(United Kingdom of Great Britain and Ireland) DI Edward Stevenson †

Strength
32–36	17

Casualties and losses
None	7 dead 6 wounded
- Location within island of Ireland

The Carrowkennedy ambush was an ambush carried out by the Irish Republican Army (IRA) on 2 June 1921, during the Irish War of Independence. An IRA flying column, commanded by Michael Kilroy, ambushed a mobile patrol of the Royal Irish Constabulary including Black and Tans recruits at Carrowkennedy, near Westport, County Mayo. It resulted in the deaths of seven of the RIC, including some who were killed by their own rifle grenade. After two hours the RIC surrendered and their weaponry and ammunition were seized by the IRA.

== Preparation ==
On Thursday 2 June, the West Mayo flying column was based in the townland of Claddy, near the road from Westport to Leenaun. In the mid-afternoon, O/C Michael Kilroy was informed that an RIC patrol including two Crossley Tender lorries and a Ford car had stopped at the rural area of Carrowkennedy.

The goal of the RIC that day was to arrest two Wallace brothers who lived in Letterass near Aasleagh Falls. The patrol was commanded by District Inspector (DI) Edward Stevenson, an ex Army officer in the Black Watch from County Down, who had joined the RIC in July 1920 and been promoted to DI in October of that year. A local mechanic/electrician called Gus Delahunt was pressed into service by District Inspector Stevenson to drive the Ford car as a police driver was unwell. It is not clear who owned the car. The RIC were apparently not aware that Delahunt had previously helped the IRA by servicing commandeered vehicles and raiding for petrol. Delahunt led the way in the car with an RIC officer followed by the Crossley tenders. They arrived in Carrowkennedy at about One or Two O'Clock. The local IRA had blocked the road just beyond Cushlough Church with trenches, which the RIC got local men spreading turf to fill in. The IRA Active Service Unit saw the convoy through binoculars from Claddy and made their way secretly to the main road. Kilroy knew that the patrol would have to return the same way as the IRA had destroyed Glenacolly Bridge in Erriff, four miles further towards Leenaun. The approximately 35 well armed IRA volunteers were divided into three sections and subdivided into small units of six men under the command of a more experienced officer. The Westport men, led by Vice-Brigadier Brodie Malone, formed one section. Vice-Brigadier Ned Moane, Jack Keane, Jack McDonagh, Joe Baker, Joe Duffy, Tommy Heavey, the brothers Paddy and Johnny Duffy, Jimmy Flaherty, Batty Cryan. Dr John Madden was on the right. They were placed on high ground 120 yards from the road. They were behind a stone wall and removed stones to form firing positions. Southward was scrub and a stone wall. The second section was formed mainly of Newport men. These included Commander Joe Doherty, Captain Jim Moran and Rick Walsh They were positioned further west, from the end of the first section's position along a wood to the main road, at an old burned-out police hut, which was used in the Land War to keep the Widow Salmon, who still lived Fifty yards to the rear, in order. The third section, from Louisburgh, crossed the road to hold a hill above the junction to Drummin. The sections were to hold fire until all the vehicles were in range of the whole column. Kilroy had learned from the failed ambush at Kilmeena. He handpicked snipers to kill the drivers of both Crossley Tenders. He also assigned men to watch any machine gunners.

On discovering the Glenacolly Bridge destroyed, the patrol went to Darby Hastings Pub for refreshments. The Ford Car had broken down at about the same time, Delahunt had made repairs and brought to the rear which he later felt had saved his life. The patrol headed back towards Westport. Contrary to regulations, Stevenson was driving the first lorry, when he should have been in the back of the second lorry with his men. This increased his risk and separated him from his men.

== Ambush ==
At 6:30 PM an IRA scout signalled the approach of the patrol. Jimmy O'Flaherty, a former Connaught Ranger, lined up his rifle sights on DI Stevenson in the lead vehicle, killing him with a shot to the head. The lorry lurched forward, stopped in the middle of the road and came under heavy fire from the IRA above. The RIC men quickly tumbled out and got down behind a bank which gave them some cover. They took out a Lewis gun and trained it on the third section of IRA men. After two short bursts of fire, the gunner lay dead beside his gun. A second gunner fired a burst from the Lewis in the direction of the third section, then he swung the muzzle in the air to protect himself from the riflemen above. This was unsuccessful and he too fell dead beneath the gun. Three men in all died trying to use the gun, according to Michael Kilroy. Four men in the lorry were now dead: DI Stevenson and Constables Sydney Blythe, James Brown and John Doherty. The remaining men in the lorry were led by Sergeant Francis Creegan, an Irishman. They attached a rifle grenade launcher to a Lee–Enfield rifle and launched grenades towards the IRA to keep them at bay. Brodie Malone's men were out of range but the grenades kept them from approaching the RIC. The two sides shot at each other with rifles. The IRA sang battle songs. Kilroy feared the IRA would run out of ammunition. Tommy Heavey and Johnnie Duffy had bayonets. They approached the rear of the truck. A grenade had exploded in the truck. A white handkerchief of surrender fluttered. Only three men were alive in the truck: Creegan, Constables Cullen and one Black and Tan.

Meantime the second lorry was stopped by rifle fire from both sides of the road as soon as shots were heard from the direction of the first lorry, killing the second driver. This lorry coasted to the ditch at the side of the road. The men jumped out the back and ran 20 yards to a bridge. Joe Ring ran across the road to get to their rear. The RIC shot at him. He made his way to a hillock and kept them pinned down. William French, a Black and Tan tried a flanking movement on the main RIC position. Jimmy O'Flaherty wounded him and he fell into the ditch near the bridge. After a while the RIC men ran into the thatched cottage of the Widow McGreal facing onto the road. They poked rifles through the front windows and through a window high in the gable which looked down on the Westport road. They needlessly used up a lot of ammunition and then realized that they had left their spare ammunition in the lorry. They unsuccessfully tried to persuade the householder and her young son to fetch the ammunition.

Ernie O'Malley stated that the motor car was some distance behind the second lorry and stopped beyond the cottage. Price stated that it was being towed by the second lorry. Three RIC men jumped off the exposed side and two remained on the sheltered side of the road which had a thicket beside it next to the cottage. One of the RIC men advanced towards the IRA position but was badly wounded.

Two hours went by. Michael Kilroy was worried that if the first lorry did not surrender soon, the column might not have time to concentrate on the RIC men in the cottage. Enemy reinforcements could arrive from Westport, Castlebar or Ballinrobe, by road or over the hills to the east. A fresh assault on the lorry was made by IRA volunteers Johnny Duffy and Tommy Heavey, who had bayonets. A rifle grenade which was being hurled by the RIC fell back into the lorry and exploded, killing the man who threw it and fatally wounding others beside him. A handkerchief was hoisted by Sergeant Creegan on a rifle to surrender. Only one of the men in the lorry was unhurt. Sergeant Creegan was fatally wounded in the legs and abdomen. A door borrowed from the widow Sammons house was used as a stretcher for the badly wounded Creegan. Being both Irish policemen the householder prepared a drink for Creegan and the other wounded constable Cullen who remained outside as it was warm.

As Michael Kilroy and Brodie Malone were discussing the issue of the McGreal house, they were interrupted by IRA volunteer O'Flaherty who fired on the occupied cottage from a covered position, using the captured Lewis gun. O'Flaherty had been a number one gunner in France, and had the Lewis Gun handed to him by John Madden. The men inside came out with their hands above their heads.

The IRA captured 22 rifles, eight drums for the Lewis gun, several boxes of grenades, 21 revolvers, and about 6000 rounds of rifle ammunition. The IRA then poured petrol over the two lorries and the car and set them ablaze.

The RIC who died were District Inspector Edward James Stevenson, Sergeant Francis Creegan, Constables Sydney Blythe, James Brown, John Doherty, Thomas Dowling, and William French. and the others surrendered. Of the RIC dead, three, John Doherty, of Roscommon, Francis Creegan of Fermanagh and Thomas Dowling of Laois were 'old RIC' constables (having joined the force respectively in 1896 and 1900), while the others were 'Black and Tans', that is war veterans, all except DI Stevenson from Britain, who had joined the RIC in 1920 or 1921. The Black and Tans who surrendered were not killed, even though this policy had been endorsed by IRA General Headquarters. Many of the local people went into hiding to avoid the retribution of the Black and Tans. The IRA volunteers evaded capture by sheltering in safe houses.

== See also ==
- Timeline of the Irish War of Independence
