= Lankill Standing Stone =

- Gallán Lainn Chille (Irish)
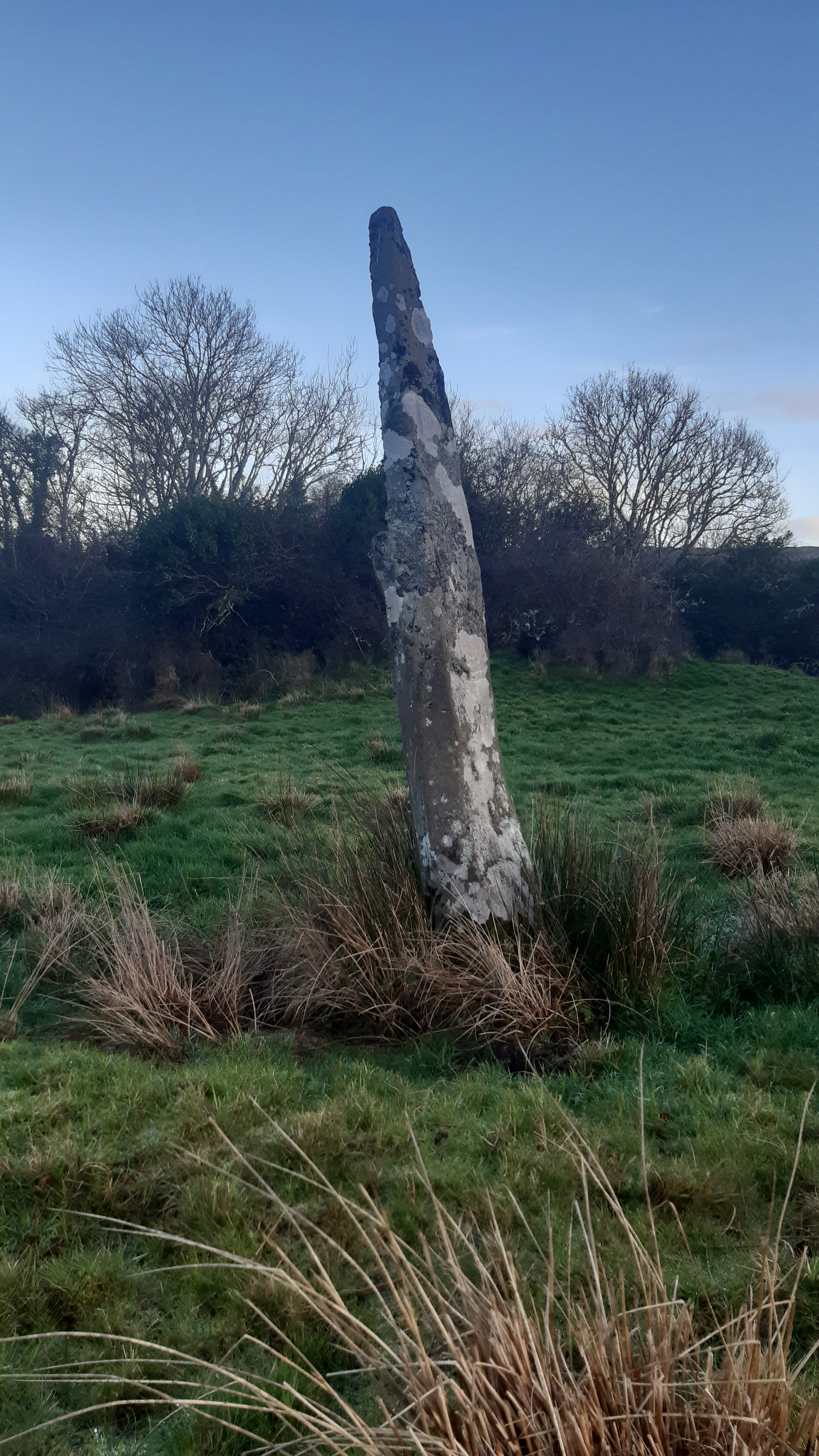
- The stone in January 2026

- Location within Ireland
- 53.753238°N 9.501742°W
- Type: Standing stone
- Location: Lankill, Aughagower, County Mayo, Ireland

History
- Built: 2000 BC or later

Site notes
- Elevation: 47 m (154 ft)
- Height: 2.5 m (8 ft 2 in)

National monument of Ireland
- Official name: Lankill Standing Stone
- Reference no.: 296

Lankill Standing Stone is a standing stone and National Monument located in County Mayo, Ireland.

== Location ==
Lankill Standing Stone stands in a field 2.7 km (1.7 mi) west-southwest of Aughagower, south of Knappaghbeg Lough. Toberbrendan, an early monastic site, is immediately to the southwest.

== History ==
The stone possibly dates to the Bronze Age period but was Christianised centuries later with a cross carved on it.

The purpose of standing stones is unclear; they may have served as boundary markers, ritual or ceremonial sites, burial sites or astrological alignments.

== Description ==
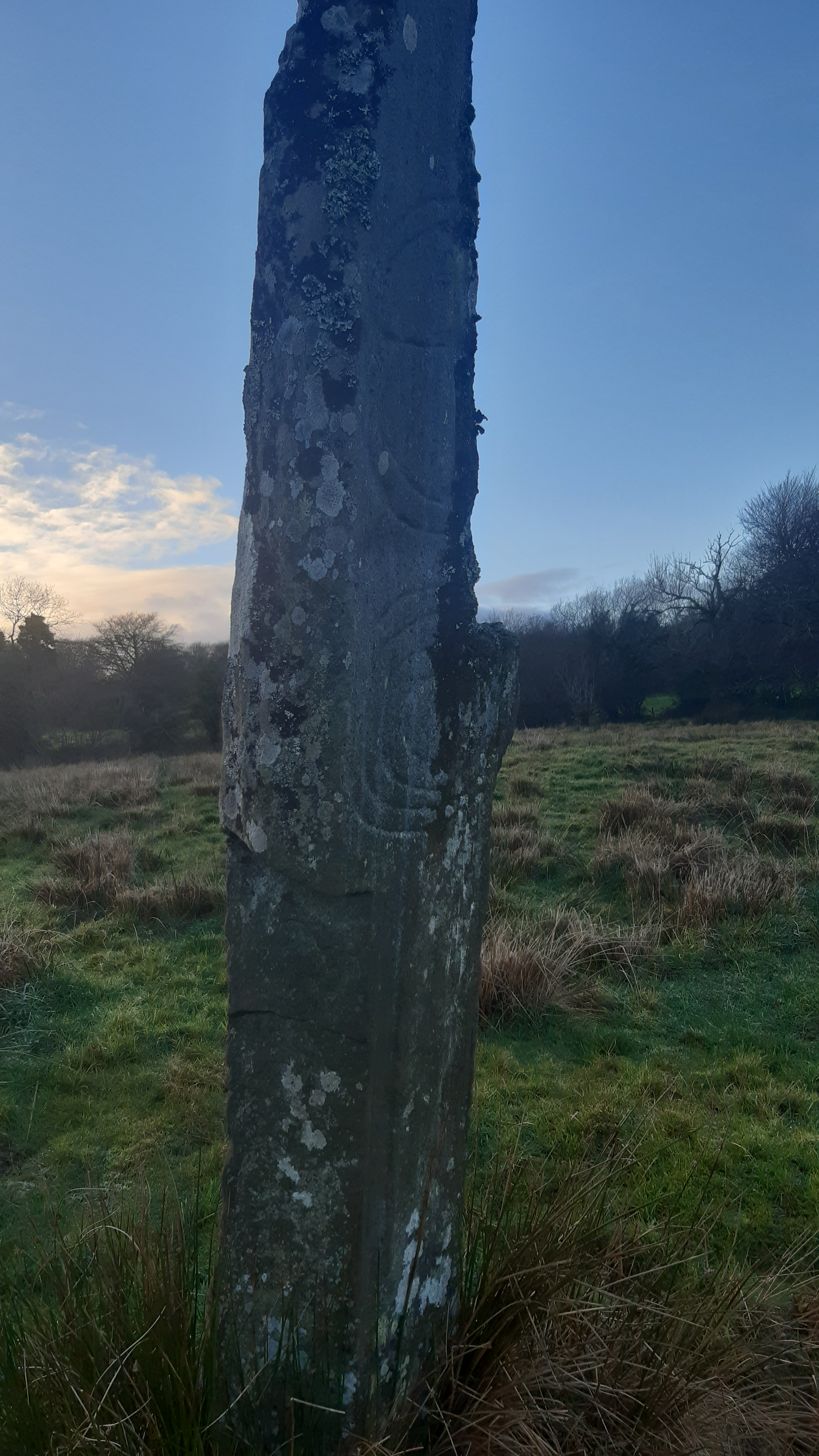
Markings on the east side of the stone

The stone is a spike of shale 2.5 m (8 ft 2 in) tall. On the west face is a cross with a V-shaped ornament beneath it, and on the east face is a Latin cross in a double circle and four concentric circles; this probably indicates a "pagan" monument that was later appropriated by Christians.
