= Dooncastle =

Townland in County Mayo, Ireland

Coordinates: 53.797°N 9.460°W

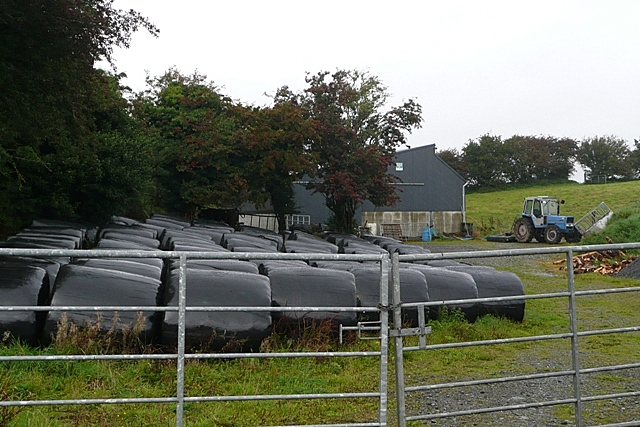
Farm at Dooncastle

Dooncastle (Irish: Caisleán an Dúin, meaning 'Fort Castle') is a townland in County Mayo, Ireland, 4 km to the east of Westport. It is in the parish of Aughagower which is in the barony of Burrishoole.

The townland is bordered to the west by the townland of Derrygorman (parish of Westport), to the north by the townland of Sheean (parish of Islandeady), to the southwest, Meneen townland (Aughagower parish), to the south, Knockroosky townland (Aughagower parish), to the east, Cushinkeel townland (Aughagower parish), and to the northeast, Doon (Aughagower parish).

In Dooncastle townland are the remnants of Doon Castle, a former stronghold of the McPhilpin clan.

The railway line between Westport and Manulla Junction passes through the southern part of the townland, the N5 road through its northern part.
