= Islandeady =

Islandeady Oileán Éadaí
- Village
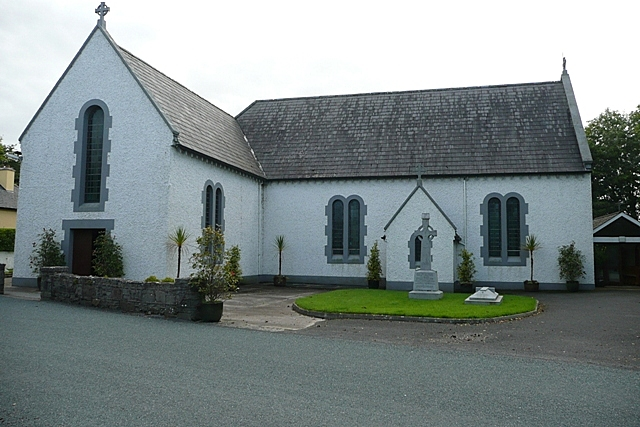
- St. Patrick's church, Islandeady
- Motto: Ar Aghaidh Le Chéile
- Location in Ireland
- Coordinates: 53.826°N 9.401°W
- Country: Ireland
- Province: Connacht
- County: County Mayo

Area
  - Total: 42.02 km^{2} (16.22 sq mi)
- Elevation: 57 m (187 ft)
- Irish Grid Reference: M077871

Islandeady (Irish: Oileán Éadaí) is a village in County Mayo, Ireland, about halfway between the towns of Castlebar and Westport.

The parish of Islandeady meets Castlebar to the east, Westport and Newport to the west, and Aughagower and Killawalla to the south. There is a view of Croagh Patrick to the west and Nephin to the northeast. The main route by road is the N5. The parish has four national schools and a private secondary school.

== History ==
Islandeady civil parish straddles the baronies of Carra and Burrishoole. Its name was reinterpreted in recent centuries as Oileán Éadaí but ultimately derives in fact from Oileán Éadain, where Éadan is a gaelicised form of the Anglo-Saxon name Aedwine or Haedwine. A person of this name was ordained bishop of Mayo in the late eighth century, according to the medieval chronicler Symeon of Durham. The Islandeady townland of Raheens is mentioned in an early biography of Saint Patrick by Tírechán (700c). Islandeady townland was historically called Illaneedan. Islandeady belonged to the 'Patrician lands of Connacht'. The date given by historians to St.Patrick's missionary work in Islandeady is 440 A.D., where he preached on the shores of a lake in the peaceful little parish. Today, the modern village lies within the townlands of Rinnaseer and Cloonan.

On 2 September 1973 during 'The Troubles', Royal Ulster Constabulary reservists from Lisnaskea were attacked by gunmen at Kilbree Lower on the Westport-Castlebar road, as they were on their way home from a fishing holiday in Westport. There were no fatalities, but three members were wounded by automatic fire.

== Amenities ==
National schools in the area include Cloggernagh NS, Cougala NS, and Cornanool NS. St. Patrick's Academy is a local (private) secondary school.

Islandeady had a shop, beside the church, which closed in 1988. An embroidery and sewing shop is located behind the church. There is also a B&B beside the GAA pitch. The lakes in the area include Lough Bilberry and Lough Lannagh.

== Transport ==
Islandeady is served by the N5 (Westport-Dublin road) national primary road.

Islandeady railway station, which was 2-km south of the village and opened in May 1914 on the Midland Great Western Railway Athlone to Westport line, was closed in June 1963.

== Notable people ==
- Ray Moylette, boxer.
- Enda Kenny, former Taoiseach.
- Seán Mac Aoidh, poet.

== See also ==
- Island Eddy, an off-shore island in County Galway
- Claggarnagh East, Islandeady
- List of towns and villages in Ireland
