= Newport, County Mayo =

Newport Baile Uí Fhiacháin
- Town
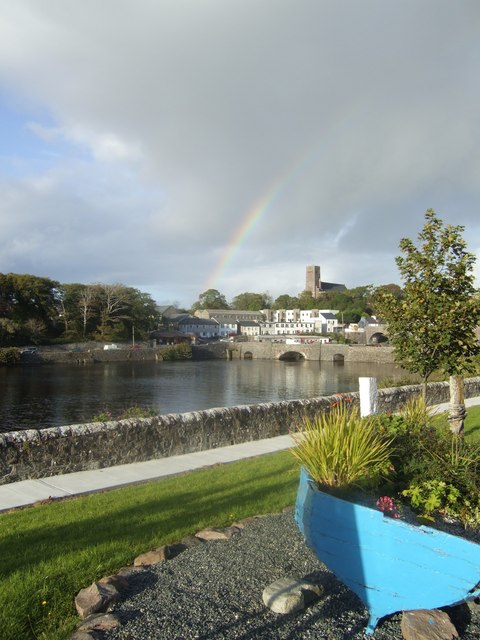
- View across the harbour of the town, 2007

- Location in Ireland
- Coordinates: 53°53′06″N 09°32′47″W
- Country: Ireland
- Province: Connacht
- County: County Mayo
- Elevation: 14 m (46 ft)

Population (2022)
  - Total: 815
- Time zone: UTC+0 (WET)
  - Summer (DST): UTC-1 (IST (WEST))
- Irish grid reference: M989937

Newport (Irish: Baile Uí Fhiacháin), historically known as Ballyveaghan and also as Newport-Pratt, is a small town in the barony of Burrishoole, County Mayo, Ireland. The population was 815 in 2022. It is on the west coast of Ireland, along the shore of Clew Bay, north of Westport. The N59 road passes through the town. The county town of Castlebar is approximately 18 km east of Newport. The Black Oak River flows through the centre of the town, and there are walking paths along its banks.

== Transport ==
=== Bus ===
Bus Éireann route 440, via Westport and Knock Airport, operates once a day in each direction. On Sundays route 440 does not operate however Expressway route 52 provides an evening journey each way to/from Westport and Galway.

=== Rail access ===
There had once been a Newport railway station, on the Westport to Achill line, but it closed in 1937 and today it forms part of the Great Western Greenway. The station building remains, and has been refurbished and repurposed.

Today, the nearest train station is Westport, which is approximately 14 km south.

== History ==
Newport was established in the early 18th century by the Medlycott family. James Moore, working for the Medlycott Estate, designed the quay at Newport in a formal layout. The Medlycott family's land agent was a Captain Pratt. Pratt introduced linen manufacturing to the town under the management of immigrant Quakers who relocated to County Mayo from Ulster. It would appear that, although the immigrant Quakers found living conditions in Mayo difficult, the linen industry picked up in the mid-18th century and for the next forty years or so the town prospered around the industry. By the early 19th century it again fell into decline, and it was superseded as a port by the town of Westport seven miles to the south. At the end of the 18th century, the Medlycott Estate was taken over by the O'Donel family, who built Newport House overlooking the harbour.

=== Quakers in Newport ===
In 1719, a community of Quakers came to Newport under a Captain Pratt who established a colony of linen weavers in the town which was known as Ballyvaughan at that time. Quakers, due to their reputation of being honest and hard-working tenants, were sought after by the landlords of estates at the time. Quaker communities usually prospered wherever they went, but the Quakers in Newport were reported to be in poor circumstances, and they needed support and help from other Quakers across Ireland and further afield from whom they were now far removed geographically by their remote location. The nearest community of Quakers was based in Ballymurray, County Roscommon.

The Newport Quakers appear to have had no meeting house, instead meeting for religious worship in each other's homes. With many deaths of their young people occurring within the community in the years after resettling in Mayo, a burial ground had to be established for them in the town. The linen business interests fell on hard times, and life was a struggle with constant assistance having to be brought to Newport by visiting Quakers. By 1736, the Newport Quakers started to think about moving from their settlement. They were unable to find suitable marriage partners from within their own community as they were all closely related, and this caused them concern. The Newport Quaker community struggled on for a few more years and eventually bought some land in Roscommon where they would be closer to the Quaker community at Ballymurray. During the winter of 1739/1740, the last of the Newport Quakers left their Newport land and homes and moved to County Roscommon, where their lives would be less wretched. Some Quakers went to America to make new lives for themselves in the years that followed.

=== Convent of Mercy ===
The O'Donel family, who took over from the Medlycotts, were Protestant. However, George O'Donel's wife was a Catholic and he donated three acres of land on Barrack Hill to the Sisters of Mercy to build a convent in Newport. It was noted that when the foundations were being dug out for the new convent in 1884, many coins and buttons were unearthed, the buttons bearing the inscription of "Pratt". In 1887, the convent was completed, and St. Joseph's Convent National School opened with a roll of 211 girls and 34 boys. The school was a success, and numbers continued to grow. The nuns were a popular addition to Newport and local merchants donated gifts to the convent. In 1894, a lace school to train girls in the lacemaking industry opened and provided some industry - until the lace market collapsed after World War II. Due to rationalisation, the sisters vacated the convent in 1977 and took up residence in a rented building in the town. The convent managed Newport Secondary School which opened in September 1956. However following the introduction of free education and free transport for second level pupils in the late sixties, the secondary school which had always experienced some difficulties in attracting a sufficiently large number of pupils was finally closed in June 1969. Since 1969 then, Newport pupils again travel to secondary schools in Westport.

=== Revolutionary period ===
On 18 May 1921, Michael Kilroy sent out three sections of the West Mayo Flying Column of the Irish Republican Army to provoke the Royal Irish Constabulary RIC). The Newport raiding party of four led by Captain Jim Moran shot dead Sergeant Francis Butler of the Royal Irish Constabulary (RIC) as he returned from his home to the RIC station on Castlebar Road. Although Sergeant Butler was believed by the IRA to be one of five RIC men who abused civilians in the Newport area it is unlikely that they could recognise him from their vantage point 300 yards away . There was only one shot. In retaliation, Michael Kilroy's home was fired upon, and his wife had to throw herself over their baby Peadar as bullets shot the plaster off the walls. The house was then burned down. His brother John Kilroy's shop in Newport was also destroyed.

== Places of interest ==
Newport has a disused railway viaduct crossing the river, which, together with the Catholic church on top of the hill, dominate the town. St. Patrick's Church was built in 1914 in the Irish Romanesque Revival style by Rudolph M. Butler. It has a stained glass east window of the Last Judgment, the last window completed by Harry Clarke in 1930. Burrishoole Friary and Grace O'Malley's Rockfleet Castle are both just to the west of the town. The town is an angling and tourist centre with two main hotels, Newport House (opened during the summer) and Hotel Newport (opened all year round), which are conveniently located on the main street and the track of the Greenway.

The Kelly homestead, the ancestral home of the actress Grace Kelly, the Princess consort of Monaco, is situated off the main road from Newport to Castlebar near the Leg of Mutton Lake. It was visited by Princess Grace and her husband Prince Rainier during their 1961 state visit to Ireland. Grace bought the property in 1979.

Newport is also home to the Mayo Dark Sky Festival which takes place across Newport, Mullranny and Ballycroy. It takes place on the first weekend of November every year.

== Gallery ==
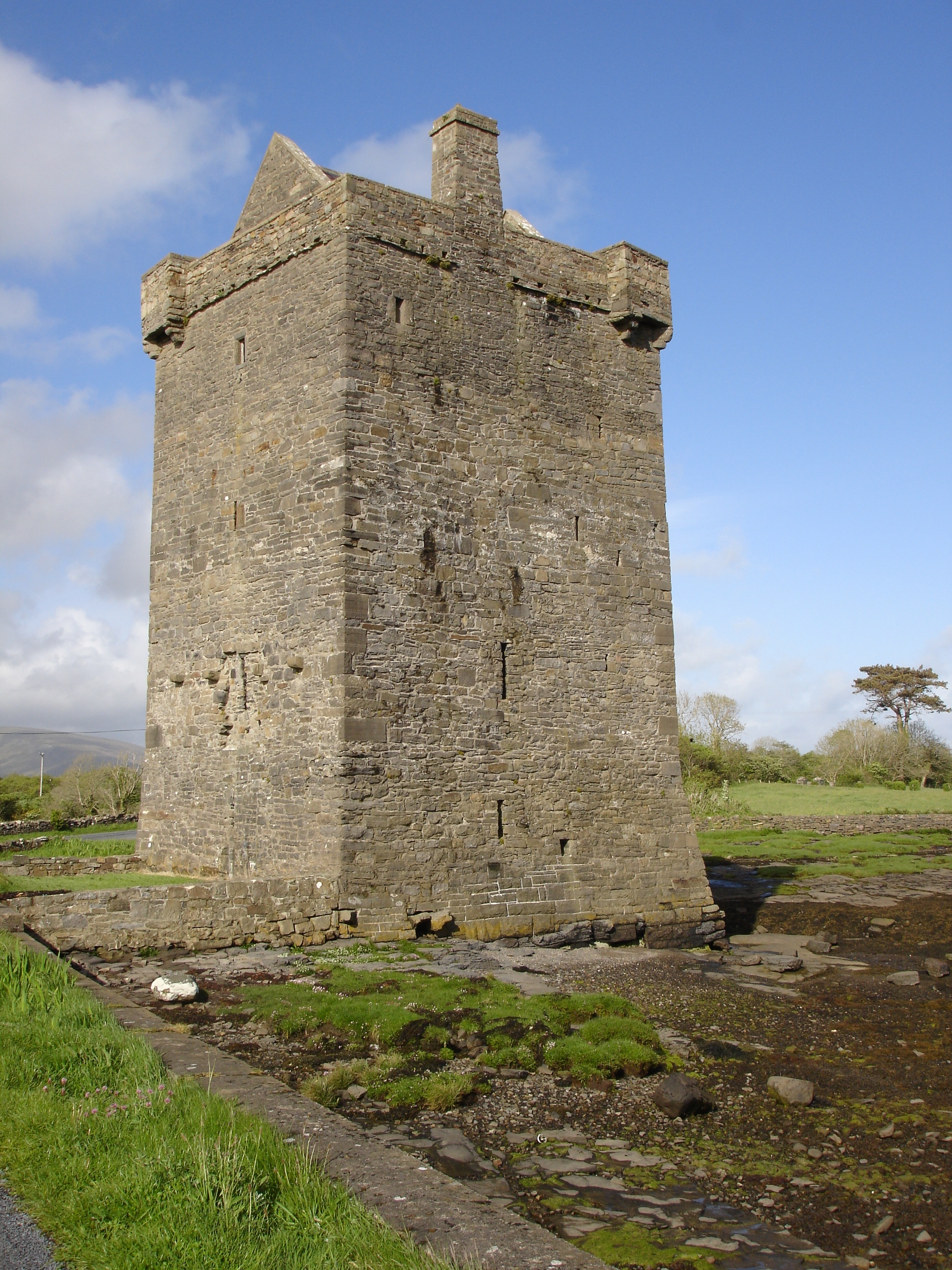
Rockfleet (Carrickahowley) Castle, near Newport

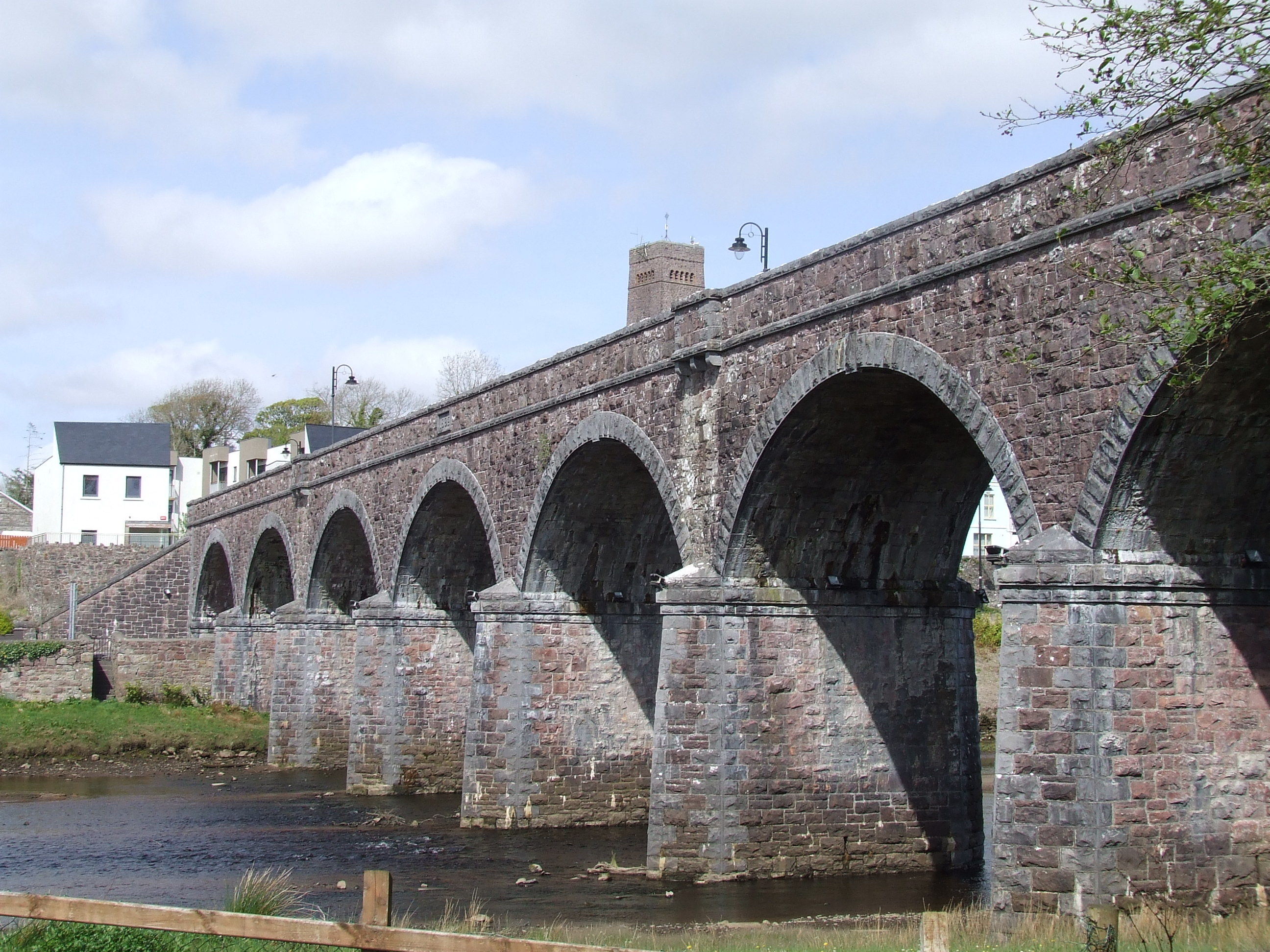
Seven Arches Bridge in 2011

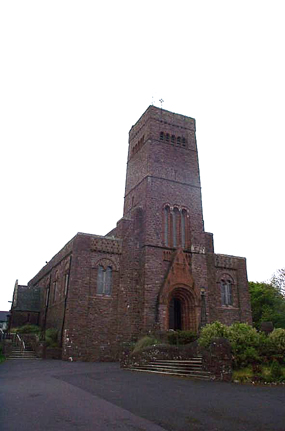
Newport Church

== See also ==
- List of towns and villages in Ireland
- Nevin (surname)
