= Aughagower =

Village in County Mayo, Ireland

Aughagower Achadh Ghobhair
- Village
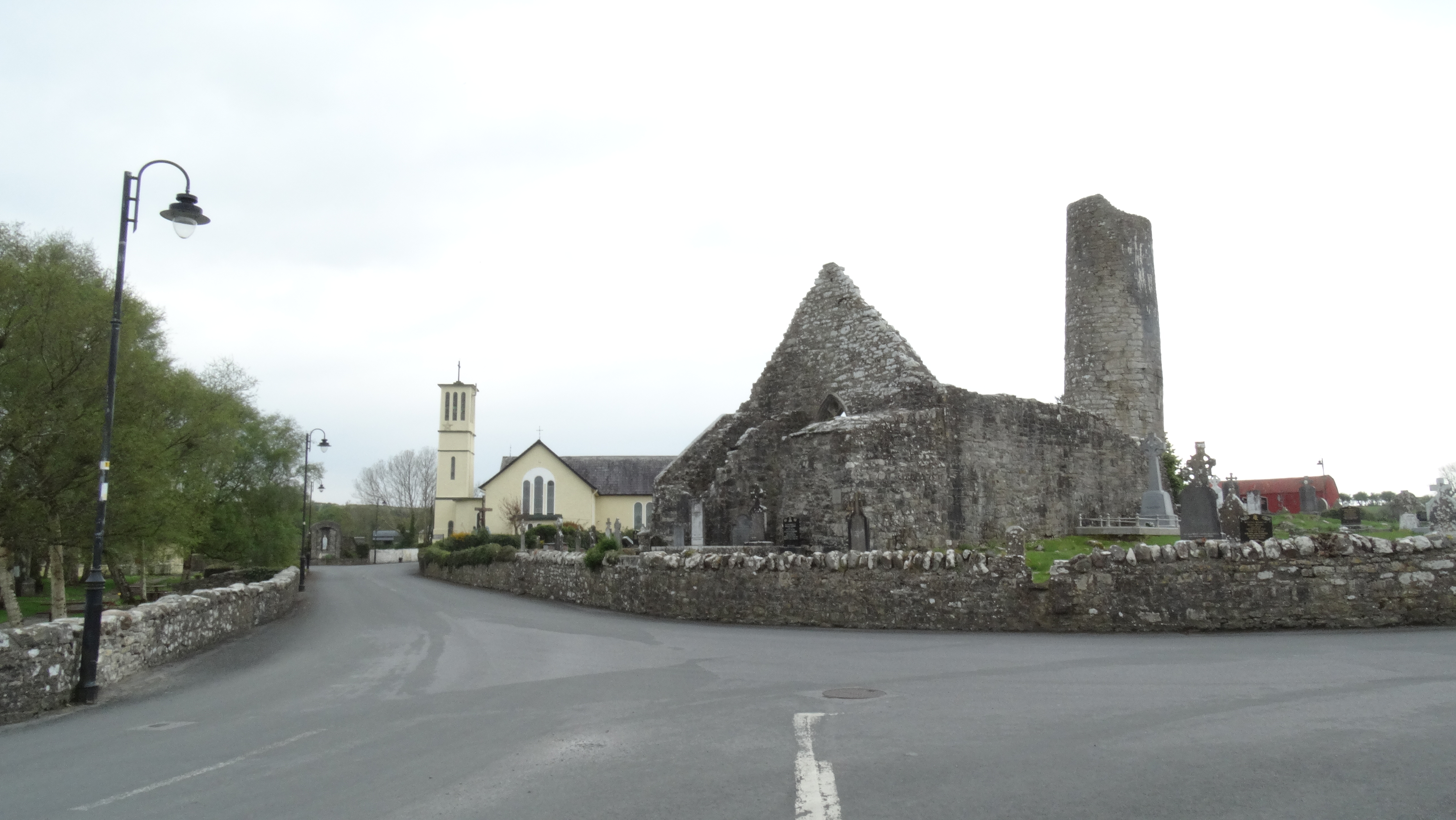
- Aghagower's round tower

- Location in Ireland
- Coordinates: 53°45′49″N 9°27′50″W
- Country: Ireland
- Province: Connacht
- County: County Mayo
- Elevation: 157 m (515 ft)
- Time zone: UTC+0 (WET)
  - Summer (DST): UTC-1 (IST (WEST))
- Irish Grid Reference: M034803
- Website: www.aughagower.ie

Aughagower or Aghagower (Irish: Achadh Ghobhair, meaning 'field of the spring') is a small village in rural County Mayo in western Ireland. It is 6 km south-east of Westport. Aughagower has around forty houses, a pub and a shop, with a clear view of Croagh Patrick from Reek View. It is also at the centre of Aghagower civil parish which covers an area of 86.1 square miles. The village is known for its links to Saint Patrick and Tóchar Phádraig, the pilgrimage route from Ballintubber Abbey to Croagh Patrick, and its round tower.

== History ==
=== Middle Ages ===
Aughagower came to prominence in 441 when Saint Patrick founded a church and bishopric, and placed over it Bishop Senach; the Book of Armagh states that bishops still dwelt there in the time of the writer (early part of the ninth century). Senach was one of Saint Patrick's closest followers, originally from Armagh, who traveled with him to Aughagower and Croagh Patrick as part of his household.

Saint Patrick is recorded as having stayed in Aughagower where he built a church and anointed the parish's first bishop, Senach, on his journey to Croagh Patrick. Aughagower lies mid-way along Tóchar Phádraig, formerly a part of the royal processional route from Cruachan (the ancient capital of Connacht), and later an important pilgrimage route from Ballintubber Abbey to Croagh Patrick. Senach founded a church, and his daughter Mathona, a nunnery. These were situated approximately 100 yards north of the medieval round tower and abbey, alongside the 'Temple of the Teeth' the site of an earlier stone church, presumed to have been built atop an original wooden church founded by Saint Patrick.

Since its formation by Saint Patrick as a bishopric in the 5th century, Aughagower represented one of the most populous and influential parishes in Umhaill. The jurisdiction of Aughagower extended over the "Owles", the territory around Clew Bay, comprising the modern deanery of Westport. But after several centuries these churches and their lands were absorbed first into the Diocese of Mayo and afterwards granted to the Archbishop of Tuam. The importance of the parish was still evident six centuries after Saint Patrick departed, as seen when in 1215 competing claims by the Archbishops of Tuam and Armagh to the church and lands of Aughagower arose, with Pope Innocent in Rome being called upon to settle the dispute, and did so in favour of Tuam.

=== Early modern ===
The importance of Aughagower parish in these warring episodes is seen by the defensive forts of Doon Castle in the townland of Dooncastle and MacPhilbin's castle in Aille (ruins of both are still standing), which were controlled by the MacPhilbin (also rendered as McPhilipin) clan, a scion of the powerful Bourke family, descending from Philip, brother of William Liath de Burgh (Bourke). The Bourkes initially battled fiercely with the Kingdom of Ireland forces. The revered Grace O'Malley Irish: Gráinne Ní Mháille of the powerful O'Malley (surname) dynasty that ruled Umhaill married into the Bourke family, with her second marriage, to Risdeárd an Iarainn Bourke. In later centuries the Bourke family became part of the Anglo-Irish ascendancy, among their descendants were the Brownes of Westport House, holding the titles of Earl of Altamount and Marquess of Sligo.

In the 15th and 16th centuries Umhaill and Aughagower saw intense internecine struggles between warring clans and the Tudor Kingdom of Ireland, led by Sir Richard Bingham who sought to establish control of the area, forcing local clans such as the Bourke clan to submit their titles and claims of land to the monarchy, and swear allegiance to the crown, after which their lands would be re-granted to them for their loyalty, under the policy of surrender and regrant.

=== Late modern and contemporary ===
A great part of the population of the parish of Aughagower was lost in the Great Famine, and traces of ruins of deserted houses exist in several parts of the parish.

The Carrowkennedy ambush took place in Carrowkennedy, in the south of Aughagower parish. One of the few encounters of the Irish War of Independence to take place in Connacht, the Carrowkennedy ambush was carried out by the Irish Republican Army (IRA) on 2 June 1921, during the Irish War of Independence. An IRA flying column, commanded by Michael Kilroy, ambushed a mobile patrol of the Royal Irish Constabulary Special Reserves (Black and Tans) at Carrowkennedy, near Westport, County Mayo. It resulted in the deaths of eight of the RIC, including some who were killed by their own rifle grenade. After two hours the RIC surrendered and their weaponry and ammunition were seized by the IRA. The RIC prisoners were not executed, but released upon their surrender, and this led many members of the successful ambush to seek refuge in the network of safe-houses throughout the counties of Mayo and Galway.

=== Round tower and Abbey ===
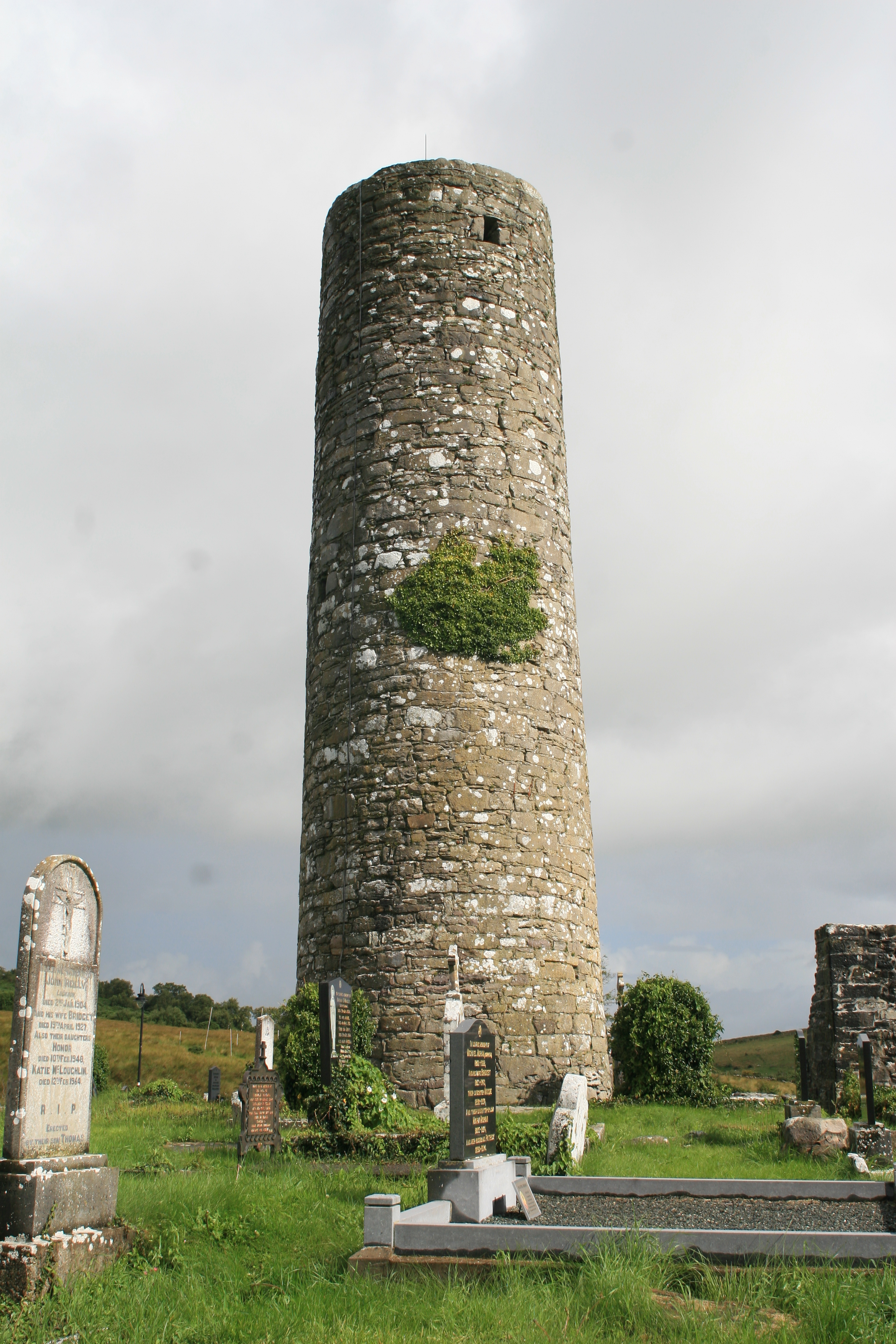
Aghagower Round tower

The ruins of a medieval church adjoins the graveyard of the town's modern Catholic church. It has a well-preserved tenth-century Irish round tower, with the exception of its topmost section and capstone.

The tower was built between 973 and 1013, a period during which the round tower proliferated, wherein they provided a defensive vantage point, a place of safety for church riches and fortification against raids from the north by the Danish, Norse-Gaels and raiding Irish clans. According to legend, the round tower's capstone was struck by lightning, and landed half a mile away on the hill of Tavenish. A local woman is said to have carried the heavy cap stone in her apron to the church, where it still remains today The tower was partly restored in 1969 and leans slightly to the north.

=== Ancient monuments and legends ===
There are a number of ancient monuments in Aughagower, some of which are locally reputed to trace their origin to the time of Saint Patrick's ministry in the parish.

Leaba Phádraig (Patrick's bed) is said to have been a place where Saint Patrick rested, which it has been suggested may have housed a hut or tent, used in the daytime as place of work for Saint Patrick.

Dabhach Phádraig (Patrick's vat or tub) is a circular bath surrounded by a stone wall, where pilgrims may have washed their feet, and which may have been used by Saint Patrick and his household as a washing place. Due to local drainage the well is now dry except in extremely wet weather. A sheela na gig (Irish: Sighle na gCíoch) was found in a nearby ditch, and the Mayo Historical Society organised for it to be fitted to the outside wall of Dabhach Phádraig in 2001. It was moved in 2017 to an internal wall for security and to make it easier to find (the light conditions affect how easily the figure can be made out), and it now forms part of Dabhach Phádraig's eastern wall.

St. Patrick's Knee is a small stone in the graveyard with a small recess carved out of it, which is filled with water. Local legend states that Saint Patrick kneeled on this rock and left the imprint, and the water that gathers in it is thought to be holy.

Tobair na Deocháin (the Well of the Deacons), now dried up, was where pilgrims drank water while performing the pilgrimage. A tree growing over Dabhach Phádraig was said to have curative powers. The soil was applied in a poultice, and when the ailment was cured the soil must be returned.

Cloughundra (Also rendered as 'Cloch Andra'). There is a large stone of approximately 150 kg, named Cloughundra, which is currently on display on the village green. The local folk-tale states that there was once a giant in Aughagower who used to throw the stone over his shoulder and would throw it "as far as another man would send a pebble. The stone is there yet and the trace of his fingers in it. A great many strongmen spend their leisure time trying to lift the stone".

Leacht Tomaltaigh is an ancient monument on the Gorteen-Aughagower townland boundary, just south of where the Tóchar Phádraig passes. Its mythical origin relates to a tale from Saint Patrick's time, that a man tested the claims of the generosity of Saint Patrick's household, where nobody in need of food would be turned away. The housekeeper is said to have told him that there was a cake in the oven, and that when it was baked he could have some. He pretended to be angry and left saying the claims of hospitality were untrue, after a few hundred yards he fell from his horse to his death and a monument was raised to mark the spot of his death. The explanation of the myth is unlikely for a number of reasons and it is thought that this monument marks the grave of one of Saint Patrick's charioteers, Totmael ('bald poll') who is recorded in the Book of Armagh and The Tripartite Life of St. Patrick as having died whilst Saint Patrick and his household were travelling to Croagh Patrick, along the Tóchar. The monument is still standing in its repaired and mortared form. It stands approximately 2.5 feet tall, although it was once a much larger monument, at a height of 6 feet.

Lankill Standing Stone is a standing stone and National Monument located in County Mayo, Ireland. It stands in a field 2.7 km (1.7 mi) west-southwest of Aughagower, south of Knappaghbeg Lough. Toberbrendan, an early monastic site, is immediately to the southwest. The stone possibly dates to the Bronze Age period but was Christianised centuries later with a cross carved on it. The purpose of standing stones is unclear; they may have served as boundary markers, ritual or ceremonial sites, burial sites or astrological alignments. The stone is a spike of shale 2.5 m (8 ft 2 in) tall. On the west face is a cross with a V-shaped ornament beneath it, and on the east face is a Latin cross in a double circle and four concentric circles; this probably indicates a "pagan" monument that was later appropriated by Christians.

Cloondacon is a townland in the Parish of Aughagower and Barony of Burrishoole in County Mayo. It is bordered to the northeast by Mace South, to the south by Tevinish East, to the southwest by Aughagower, to the west by Gorteen, and to the northwest by the Deerpark. Cloondacon is situated on Tochar Phádraig, the ancient route from Ballintubber Abbey through Aughagower to Croagh Patrick. The name Cluain Dá Chon refers to an ancient legend according to which a pagan chieftain set two wolfhounds on Saint Patrick. Instead of attacking Patrick, the hounds licked his hands. The chieftain was moved by this and became a Christian. According to an alternative version, Saint Patrick made the sign of the cross over them, and the two hounds were swallowed up in an oval shaped hole called Poll na gCon (the hole of the hounds).

== Notable residents ==
- The paternal grandparents of Canadian Prime Minister Mark Carney were originally from townlands near the village before emigrating to Canada in 1925. Prime Minister Carney came to Aughagower on June 13, 2026 during his official trip to Ireland.

== See also ==
- List of towns and villages in Ireland
