= Burrishoole =

Burrishoole Buiríos Umhaill
- Barony
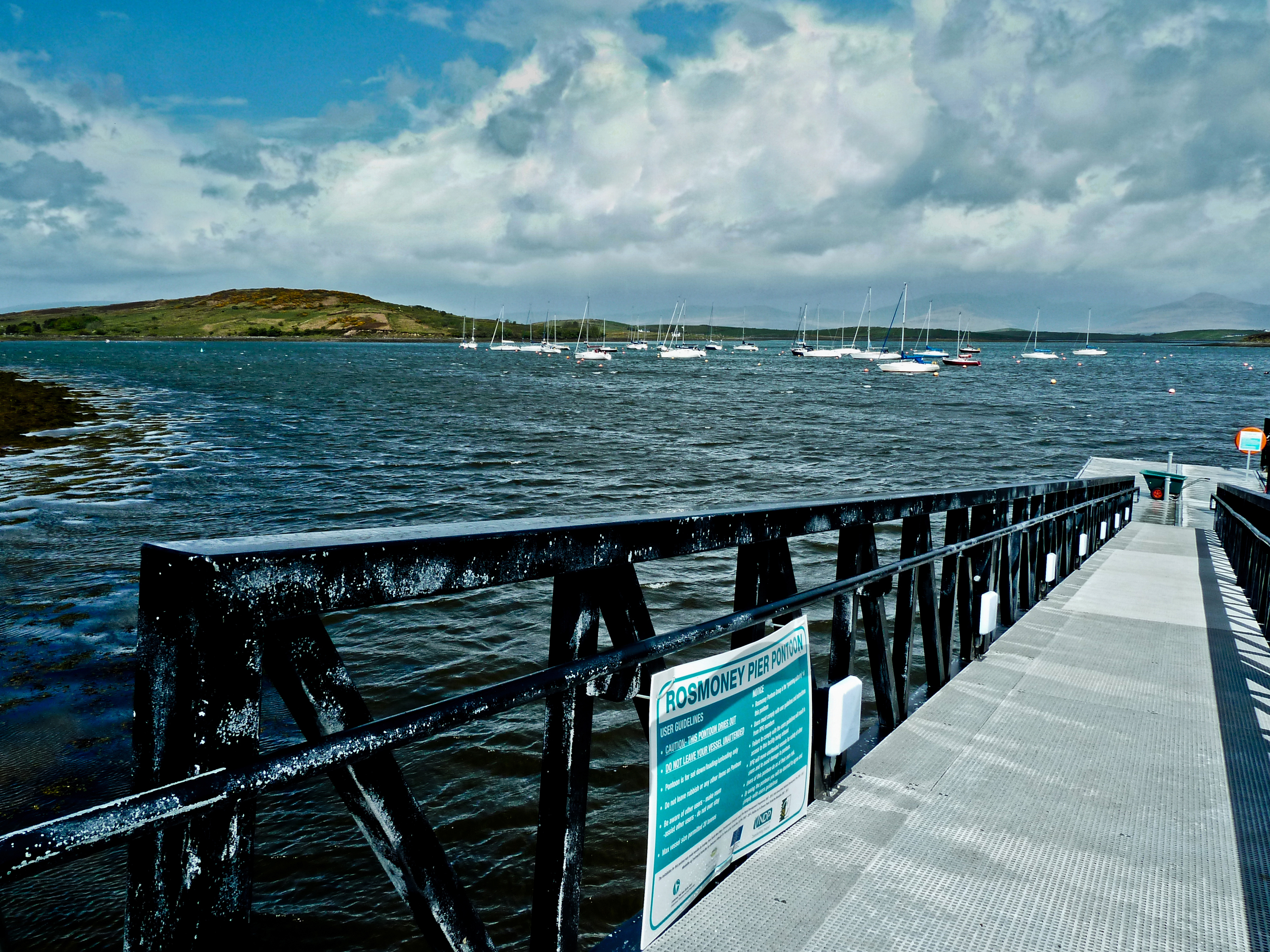
- Pier at Rosmoney

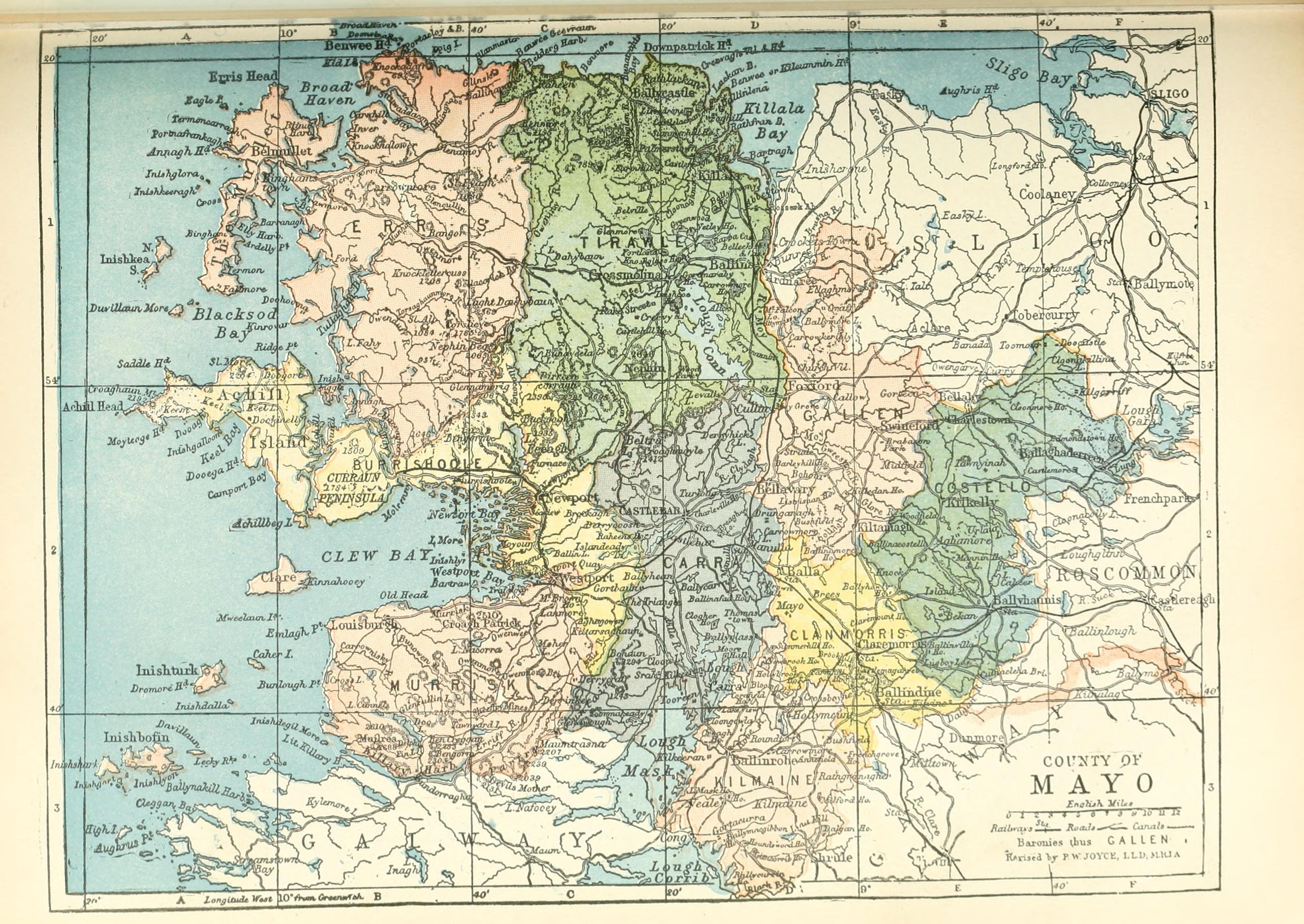
- Barony map of County Mayo, 1900; Burrishoole is in the west-centre, coloured yellow.

- Location within Ireland
- Coordinates: 53°53′N 9°43′W
- Sovereign state: Ireland
- Province: Connacht
- County: Mayo

Area
  - Total: 587.5 km^{2} (226.8 sq mi)

Burrishoole (Irish: Buiríos Umhaill) is one of the nine historical baronies of County Mayo in Ireland. It is named after the former Gaelic territory of Umhaill, which also included Murrisk barony, and roughly means "the borough or territory of Umhall" or "the owles".

== Legal context ==
Baronies were created after the Norman invasion of Ireland as subdivisions of counties and were used for administration. While baronies continue to be officially defined units, they have been administratively obsolete since 1898. However, they continue to be used in land registration and specification such as in planning permissions. In some areas, usage of the barony name is common, while in other areas barony names have fallen out of use altogether. In many cases, a barony corresponds to an earlier Gaelic tuath which had submitted to the English Crown.

Burrishoole is one of the nine baronies of County Mayo. It includes a widespread area from Newport in the east through Mulranny on the north side of Clew Bay and out to Achill Island in the west.

== Civil parishes ==
There are 7 civil parishes in the barony:

- Achill
- Aughagower
- Ballintober
- Burrishoole
- Kilmaclasser
- Kilmeena
- Islandeady

== Towns ==
- Newport
- Keel, Achill
- Achill Sound
- Mulranny
- Dugort
- Westport

== Notable people ==
- Jason Doherty
- Manus O'Donell
- Henry Butler, Lord of Umallia
