= Edward Nangle =

Irish minister and founder of a mission village

The Reverend Edward Nangle
- Missionary to Achill
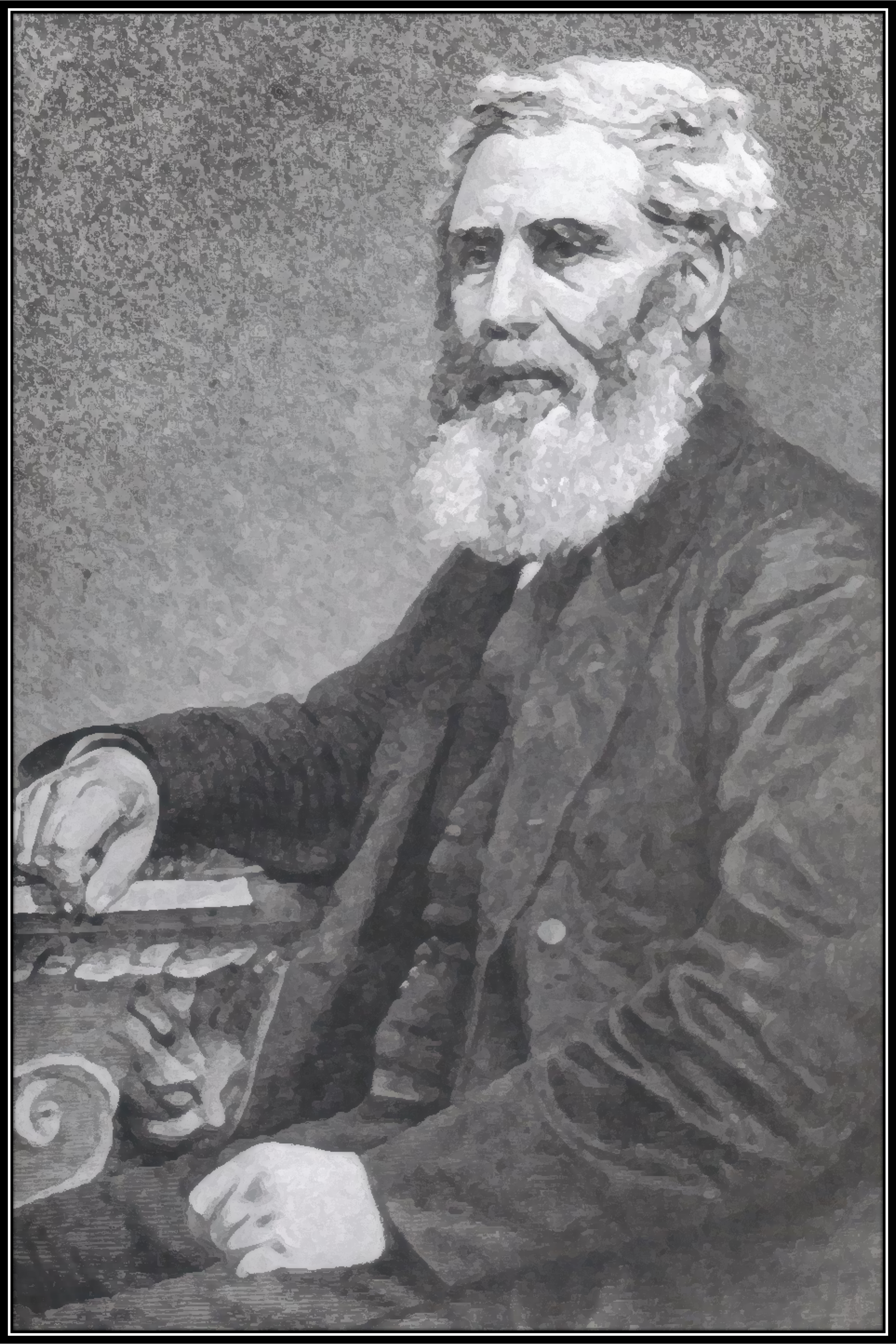
- Painting of Rev. Edward Nangle
- Church: Church of Ireland

Orders
- Ordination: 1824 by Bishop Thomas O'Beirne

Personal details
- Born: 1799 Athboy, County Meath, Ireland
- Died: 9 September 1883 (aged 83–84) Monkstown, Dublin, Ireland
- Denomination: Protestant

Edward Nangle (1799 – 9 September 1883) was a Church of Ireland minister and the founder of the Achill Mission Colony. He established a Protestant mission on Achill Island, County Mayo, in 1834 and worked there for eighteen years with the aim of bringing Protestantism to the Native Irish Christians who were impoverished in large part due to the Penal Law policies of the Protestant Ascendancy. Edward Nangle was involved in evangelical attempts to convert Catholics to Protestantism. He opened a Christian school on the island where children were taught reading, writing, agricultural skills and Christianity as part of a Missionary Colony. His presence on the island led to some press coverage and parliamentary debates. The island itself was developed with a pier built at Dugort, a courthouse at Achill Sound and a road network between numerous key locations on the island. A plaque hanging in St. Thomas Church, Dugort, dedicated to Edward Nangle and erected by friends after his death, reads: "He devoted his life from the year 1834 to the welfare of the people of Achill among whom he lived for many years."

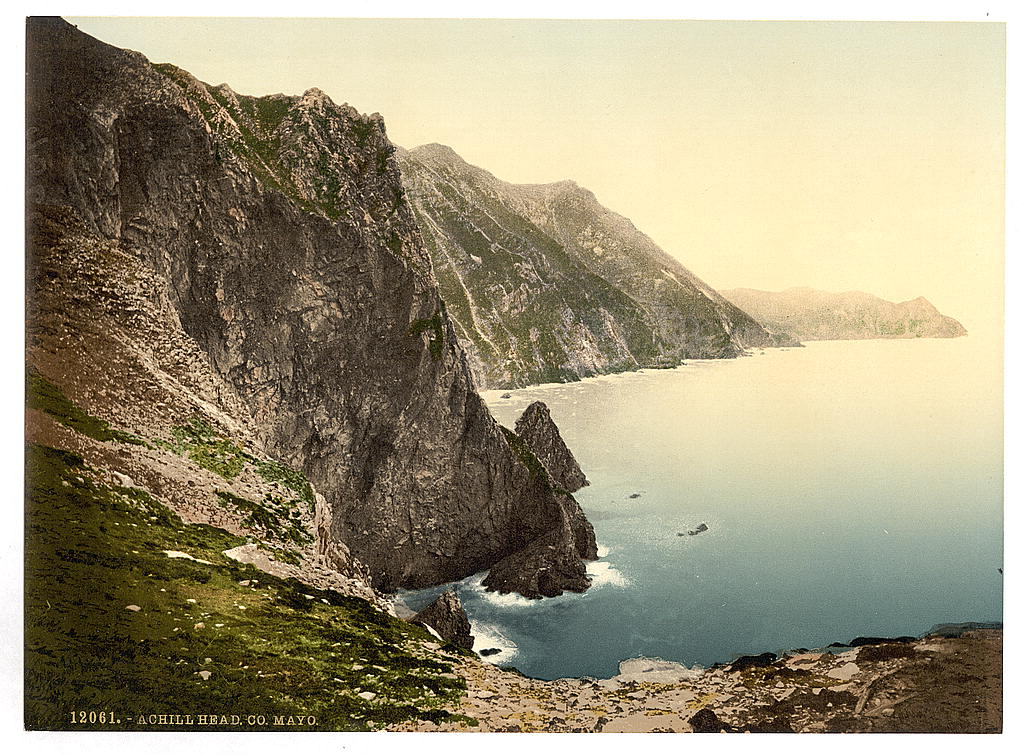
Achill

== Early life ==
Edward Nangle was born into a family from Athboy, County Meath. He descended from the Nangle family who had held the title of Barons of Navan for over six hundred years. Although by tradition, the family was Roman Catholic, Nangle was raised in the Protestant faith since his mother, Catherine Nangle (née Anne Sall) was a practicing Protestant. Nangle's mother died when he was only nine years old and shortly afterwards his father sent him to Cavan Royal School. It is supposed he studied alongside Robert Daly the Bishop of Cashel.

== Ordination ==
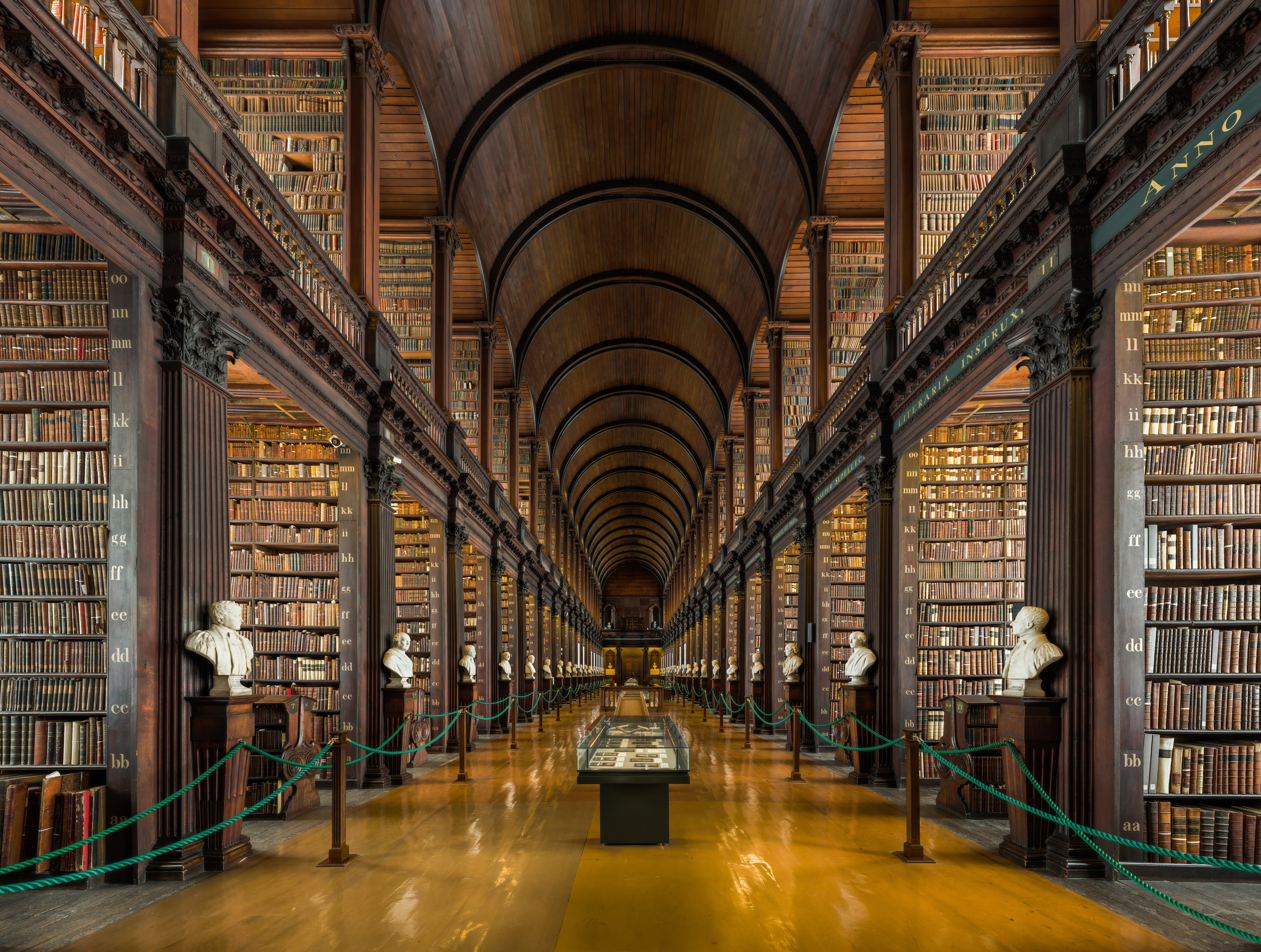
Trinity College Dublin

After secondary education, Nangle completed a Bachelor of Arts Degree in Trinity College, graduating in 1823. Although contemplating a career in medicine, Nangle decided to enter the ministry. In his biographer's words, he looked ‘forward to ordination as a means of securing an eligible social position’. It is believed that Nangle's decision to enter the ministry was the first step in what became his 'conversion experience'. As required for his theological education, he read the Bible and through this, 'the Holy Spirit enlightened the young student and he experienced true conversion'.

After his theological studies in Trinity College, in the summer of 1824, he was ordained deacon by Thomas O’Beirne, Bishop of Meath, for the curacy of Athboy in County Meath. He failed as a curate at first in Athboy and then in Monkstown, where he stayed for less than three weeks. He finally settled in Arva, a small town near Cavan Town, for the following two years.

Edward Nangle is described as a 'tall, thin, pale man who spoke in gentle tones coming across as serious and intense'. Nangle's biographer Henry Seddal described his personality: ‘Mr. Nangle was doubtless at times headstrong in forming his opinions, stubborn in holding them and harsh in giving them expression.’ In the words of a close contemporary: ‘when animated, the most extraordinary fire lights up his eyes.’

After beginning his ministry in Arva, Edward was affected by the Second Reformation religious revival in Cavan among the tenants of Lord Farnham, the landlord of a thirty-thousand-acre estate. Hundreds of tenants were arriving at Farnham's home converting from Catholicism. He suffered a nervous breakdown and during his convalescence he underwent a conversion experience and decided to dedicate himself to Protestant evangelicalism.

== Founding of the Achill Mission Colony ==
=== Beginning ===
In July 1831, Edward Nangle paid his first visit to Achill Island accompanied by his wife Eliza. He sailed there on the relief ship Nottingham after famine and cholera swept through Mayo and Sligo. After spending a night at Achill Sound, he travelled around the island on horseback. Describing his initial encounter with the island, Nangle wrote: ‘The deep silence of desolation was unbroken, except by the monotonous rippling of the tide as it ebbed or flowed, or the wild scream of the curlew disturbed by some casual intruder on its privacy’. Apparently moved by what he perceived as the spiritual and temporal destitution he witnessed among the people living on the island, Nangle decided to establish the Achill Mission Colony.

In the following three years, Nangle bought land on the island and negotiated a thirty-one-year leasing contract with Sir Richard O’Donnell, the landlord of the Burrishoole estate, which comprised most of Achill. Edward Nangle, his wife Eliza and their three young daughters arrived in Dugort on 30 July 1834. They were soon joined by Nangle's assistant, Joseph Duncan and two Scripture readers. The Nangles' friends, Dr Neason Adams and his wife Isabella, moved to the Colony in December 1835.

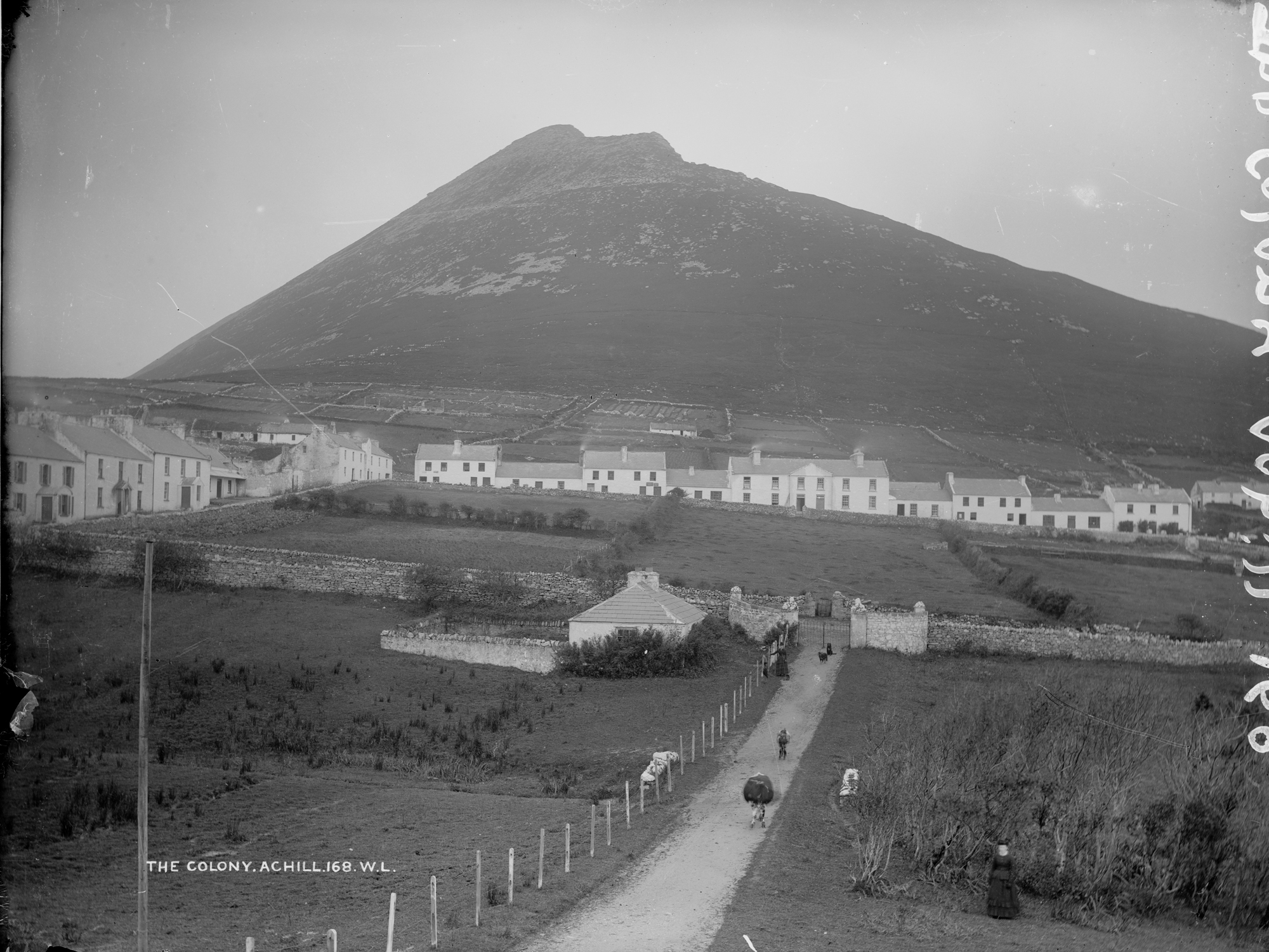
The Achill Mission Colony

On 23 December 1834, Nangle opened the Achill Mission's first school. Forty three children attended on the first day, and it was the first free school to open on the island. Within a couple of months there were schools in Dugort, Slievemore, Cashel and Keel, catering for 410 children.

In December 1835, a printing press was established at the Mission Colony headquarters at Dugort. It had been granted as a gift to the group by friends in London and York. On 31 July 1837, Nangle printed the first edition of the Achill Herald. This was a monthly Protestant newspaper and within two years, its circulation exceeded three thousand amounting to approximately a third of The Times circulation at that time. The Achill Herald was published continuously each month from 1837 to 1868 when it merged with other Protestant publications.

Four years after he took up residence on Achill, Edward Nangle wrote: ‘The Missionary Settlement has since grown into a village – the sides of a once barren mountain are now adorned with cultivated fields and gardens … and the stillness of desolation which once reigned is now broken by the hum of the school and the sound of the church-going bell.’ However, the early years of the Colony were marked by bitter confrontation between the Catholic authorities and the Achill Mission with competing schools at the centre of the conflict. An orphanage was established in 1838, and in the summer of that year, Archbishop Trench visited the island for the first time.

In 1839, the Slievemore Hotel was built, and a year later hotels were built at Achill Sound and in Newport. By 1840, a traveller could leave Dublin in the mail on a Thursday evening, sleep in Newport on Friday, reach Achill Sound on Saturday, and worship in Saint Thomas's Church, Dugort, on Sunday morning.

By the early 1840s, the Achill Mission Colony included two-storey slated houses, a printing press, an orphanage, a hospital, a post office, a dispensary, a corn mill and farm buildings, surrounded by fields reclaimed from the wet mountain slopes. In 1842, the colony accommodated fifty-six families comprising 365 individuals. Only eleven of these families (one-fifth of the total) were originally Protestant; the remaining forty-five families were originally Catholic.

=== Famine years ===
In the early years of the Great Famine, Edward Nangle became the focus of allegations that he was a 'soul-buyer' who was using funds raised for famine relief to advance his Achill evangelisation efforts particularly through the decision to provide food for the children attending the Achill Mission schools. Edward Nangle defended the school food programme arguing that, in addition to the religious programme offered, it was the most efficient way of offering famine relief and the food programme was expanded to meet demand from the islanders.

In January 1847, controversy was triggered when the Achill Mission claimed that in the previous month the Mission 'gave employment to 4,458 labourers of which number 2,000 were Roman Catholics'. In July 1847, it was suggested that 5,000 out of Achill's total population of 7,000, were receiving practical support from the mission, which had planted twenty-one tons of blight-free foreign potatoes. In the Achill Missionary Herald editions of January and February 1847, Edward Nangle appeared to admit that the Colony employment figures he had given (4,458 in December 1846) were exaggerated when he commented that these were 'aggregate' numbers. Allegations of ‘souperism’ - offering material benefits in return for religious conversion - were made against Edward Nangle in the famine years as food was provided to children in the Colony schools and conversions increased.

Thomas Plunkett, the Protestant Archbishop of Tuam, arrived at the island in the autumn of 1848 to find that there were over 2,000 children attending the mission schools. The same year, more than 3,000 were working for the mission, clearing land and building roads and walls. In November 1848, the barque William Kennedy, freighted with 220 tons of Indian meal, arrived in Achill from Philadelphia. It had enough supplies to feed 2,000 people and cost £2,200 paid for out of the mission funds.

In March 1848, hundreds of people from Dooniver, Bullsmouth and Ballycroy approved a declaration of thanks to Nangle for supplying them with potatoes and turnips during the famine, without which they would have starved.

In September 1849, 400 children were confirmed at the Achill Mission. Only twenty-eight of these were children of Protestants - the remaining 372 were converts, the majority of children in the Achill Mission schools.

=== St. Thomas Church ===
In 1848, a site was obtained for a new church in Dugort. The church was eventually erected with the aid of funds from a widow in Cheltenham, England who had donated a sum of £2,400. On 18 March 1855, St. Thomas Church was opened for divine service by Bishop Plunkett. The service was attended by 500 people including one convert of 107 years of age who walked five miles to attend.

== Opposition from the Roman Catholic Church ==
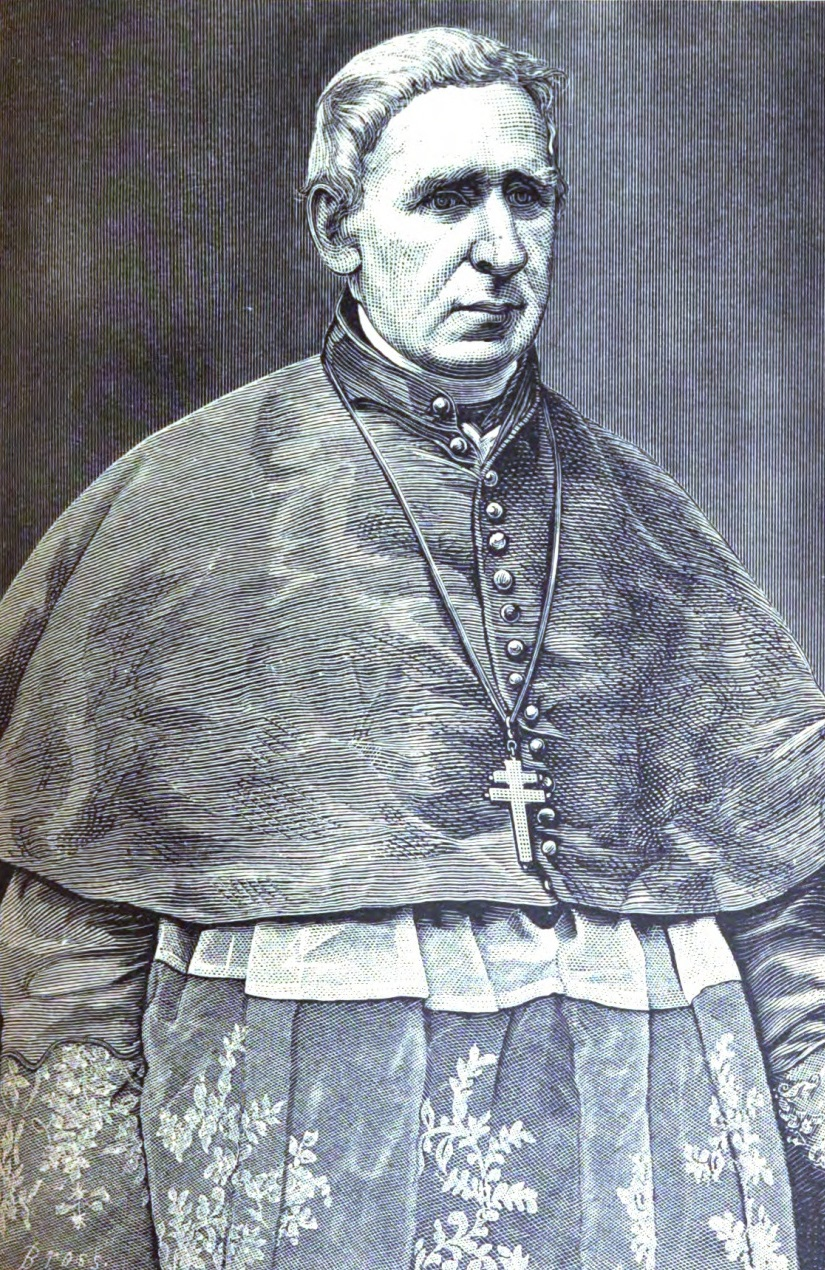
Catholic Archbishop John MacHale

The Catholic Church opposed Nangle and the Achill Mission Colony from the start. At the first Sunday school, a devout Catholic is reported to have stood near the gate with a rod threatening to beat each of the attending children. Additionally, one of the scripture readers was reportedly assaulted by two men, thrown to the ground and his clothes torn. Nangle was warned of a secret plan to attack the colony, kill those living there, burn the buildings and put an end to the Achill Mission. No attack took place but it is believed that the preparations made deterred the assailants.

In the summer of 1835, John MacHale made his first visit to Achill as Catholic Archbishop of Tuam. Followed by a crowd holding banners with the words, Down the Schematics, the Archbishop led a procession of thirteen priests. A succession of the priests addressed the crowd and denounced the colony, pronouncing a curse on all who dared associate themselves with the nearby Protestant settlement.

In 1835, after the Mission opened schools in Dugort, Cashel, Keel and Slievemore, the local parish priest responded by opening three competing schools. Nangle had an immediate grievance against the master of Dugort national school because he had reportedly "with a knife in his hand threatened to take the head of one of the children attending a school under [mission] patronage".

In 1836, John MacHale again visited Achill. This time speaking to a large crowd outdoors he said: "I call upon you to make a solemn promise this day not to have anything to do with the Achill Mission people ... There is no place outside of Hell which more enrages the Almighty than the Protestant colony ... I shall not dirty my mouth with the names of some of the people who are sending their children to the colony school. I hope they will give up doing so."

In 1837, MacHale made another visit, this time stirring up the populace against what he called "these venomous fanatics", referring to those involved with the Achill Mission Colony. Not long after his visit, a schoolmaster and scripture reader from the Mission Colony, were beaten on Clare Island and forced to take refuge in a lighthouse before they could escape the island on a coastguard vessel.

On 2 January 1839, Francis Reynolds, a coastguard officer who was denounced by name at Catholic services on several successive Sundays, died as a result of being hit on the head in a house in Keel. John and Bridget Lavelle were cleared of his murder at a trial in Castlebar in spring 1839. The two main witnesses in the case of Reynolds' murder were schooled in their evidence by a local Catholic priest who was aggressively hostile to the Mission. Nangle accused the Crown of holding a "mock" trial and as a direct consequence of these and other incidents, a new courthouse was built at Achill Sound.

In 1848, the Achill Mission produced a prospectus seeking to raise funds to purchase additional island land from Sir Richard O'Donnell. The document describes, from a Colony perspective, the sectarian unrest during the first decade of the Achill Mission as well as its activities in the early famine years. A significant development occurred in 1851 when the Achill Mission purchased a considerable amount of land from the Encumbered Estates Court and became the largest landlord on Achill Island. Shortly afterwards Nangle was transferred to the parish of Skreen, County Sligo.

In 1851, Archbishop MacHale decided to buy 1,200 acres of island land from Sir Richard O’Donnell. Shortly afterward, the foundations were laid for a Franciscan monastery, a school for the local children, a glebe house for two priests and a model farm to provide education in modern systems of agriculture. In MacHale's own words, he planned to counteract "the mischievous speculators, who, more than twenty years ago, bought a farm in Achill and planted themselves there to drive a lucrative trade on English credulity". In the process of building the new monastery complex, MacHale's workmen were accused of stealing stones from Nangle's land. On Wednesday, 7 October 1851, constables arrested a man charged with theft in relation to a heap of stones. After the workmen continued to steal stones from Nangle's land, a court case proceeded. But Daniel Cruise, the judge, dismissed the court case on the grounds that "both sides were equally to blame".

== Public scrutiny ==
In the summer of 1842, Samuel and Anna Hall visited the Achill mission. The visit was part of an Irish tour which the couple had embarked on with the aim of producing a guide book of Ireland for tourists entitled, Ireland: Its Scenery and Character. Arriving at the Colony, they conducted a brief overview of the mission, taking into account the finances expended and the practical results. However, they were not 'enamoured' by Nangle's strict approach to the entrants of the school, the mission and the orphanage.

Although they were at the Colony for less than two hours on 22 June 1842, the Halls branded the Mission ‘a complete failure’ and targeted Nangle, labelling him as a man without any genuine sense of gentle, peace-loving, Christian zeal. In a personal letter to Nangle, Samuel Hall wrote: ‘Be assured, sir, that religion is strong enough to overcome your miserable attempts to degrade it – that Christianity cannot be permanently tainted by coarseness, ignorance and bigotry of which you are representative. I have done my duty.’

In a response to the Halls' visit, Edward Nangle highlighted the significant fact that the visit had only lasted less than two hours: ‘Truly, sir, the rapidity with which you can require experience throws into shade the wonders of the steam press!’ As to the Halls’ references to the cost of the Mission's activities, Nangle replied: ‘as if the salvation of immortal souls for which Christ died, was not a worthy object for the expenditure of a smaller sum of the world’s wealth than is often squandered without a rebuke, on the follies and vanities of this perishing world’.

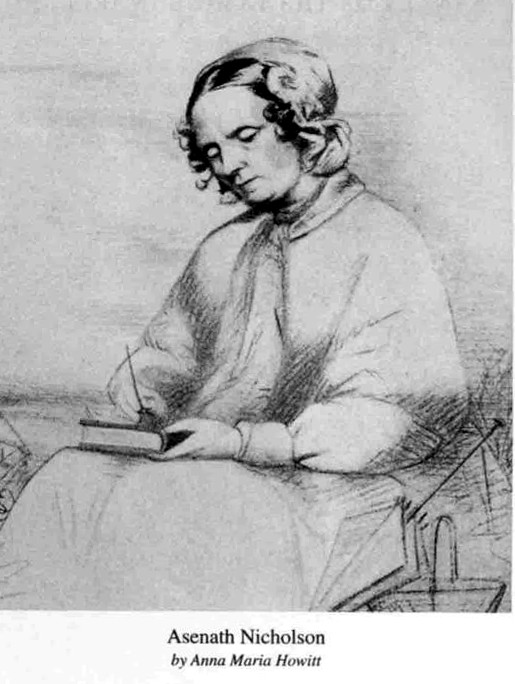
Asenath Nicholson

The Halls’ report of the Mission along with the record a similar visit undertook by Asenath Nicholson, an American author, drew unwelcome attention to the expenditure and income of the Achill Mission Colony and raised questions about the benefits of the organisation. The Halls drew up another report of the Mission in 1849, towards the end of the Great Famine, this time with a more benign approach. They paid tribute to the work of the mission staff during the crisis months of the famine, saying they were ‘indefatigable in their efforts to raise funds’ and ‘distributed with no sparing had to those who must otherwise have perished’. By 1853, the Halls were trying to avoid being drawn in to comment on the island and advised visitors to make their own judgment. By then Nangle had left Achill, and the previous allegations continued to surround the Achill Mission Colony.

== Final years ==
In 1852, Nangle left Achill after 18 years working on the island, and moved to County Sligo, where he became Rector of Skreen. Shortly afterwards he married - for the second time - Sarah Fetherstonhaugh.

From the early 1860s, Edward Nangle began a legal battle with Joseph Napier, one of the trustees of the Achill mission committee. The case started as a minor disagreement over the election of committee members, but it escalated into a major court case that dragged on for years, draining the resources of the Achill estate.

Edward Nangle returned to Achill briefly in 1879 writing ‘As I have now completed my 80th year, and am very infirm, I am unable to work for our dear people in Achill as I did for upwards of 40 years of my life.’ In 1881, he moved to Dublin and died on Sunday 9 September 1883, at the age of 84. He died at his home 23, Morehampton Road, Dublin with his second wife, Sarah by his side. Nangle is buried in Deansgrange Cemetery, Monkstown, in Dublin.

Immediately following Nangle's death, the opposing views of the members of the Protestant community in Ireland were evident. The Irish Ecclesiastical Gazette – an organ of the Church of Ireland – labelled Nangle as ‘an Evangelical of the old school’ while also passing judgment on the Achill Herald professing that it was ‘strangely deficient in Church teaching’. The negative critique of the Gazette continued into another article reviewing Nangle's biography: ‘Everyone has their own idea of heroism, and practices hero-worship after their own fashion. We are free to confess that the late Rev Edward Nangle was not a hero to our mind...’

In contrast, the Church Advocate which had amalgamated with the Achill Herald stated that ‘few clergymen of the Church of Ireland were better known or more highly valued in his day, as he was a man of much intellectual power, a clear expositor of sound scripture, and a powerful writer’.
