= Inishbiggle =

Irish island off Ballycroy coast in Mayo

Native name: Inis Bigil
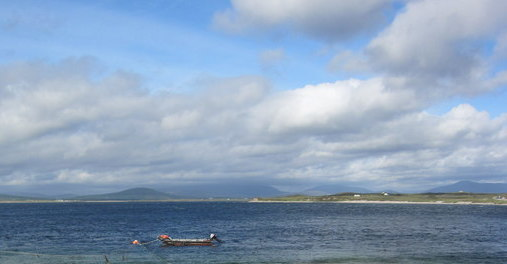
- View to Inisbiggle from nearby Achill Island

- Location within island of Ireland

Geography
- Location: Atlantic Ocean
- Coordinates: 53°59′45″N 9°54′15″W

Administration
- Ireland
- Province: Connacht
- County: Mayo

Demographics
- Population: 12 (2022)

Inishbiggle (Irish: Inis Bigil) is a small inhabited island off the coast of Ballycroy in County Mayo. Its name in Irish means "Vigil Island".

The island is unique in that it is traditionally both a Gaeltacht and Protestant.

== Geography ==
The island is situated between the northeast of Achill Island and the mainland, and is accessed by boat from either Doran's point at Ballycroy or Bullsmouth, Dooniver on Achill Island. The island is 2½ km x 1½ km, or 650 acres (2.6 km^{2}) in area.

== Description ==
The main activities are sheep and cattle farming, fishing and winkle picking. Facilities on the island included a school and a post office, both now closed.

Plans to build a cable-car link across the Bullsmouth Channel, one of the strongest currents in Europe which separates the island from Achill, had been under discussion since 1996, but have now been abandoned. Planning permission for the cablecar was denied by Mayo County Council, on the grounds that, "It would be visually obtrusive in an area of special scenic importance, that it would create traffic problems and that it would devalue houses in the vicinity."

Unpredictable currents in the channel during winter months can render the island inaccessible, even though the passage during fair weather is about ten minutes in the traditional boat, the currach. Emergency access is by helicopter.

== Demographics ==
The table below reports data on Inishbiggle's population taken from Discover the Islands of Ireland (Alex Ritsema, Collins Press, 1999) and the Census of Ireland.

In 2023 it was reported that the population dropped to 8.

Historical population

Year	Pop.	±%
1841	67	—
1851	61	−9.0%
1861	0	−100.0%
1871	154	—
1881	171	+11.0%
1891	135	−21.1%
1901	135	+0.0%
1911	149	+10.4%
1926	162	+8.7%

Year	Pop.	±%
1936	157	−3.1%
1946	106	−32.5%
1951	123	+16.0%
1956	116	−5.7%
1961	113	−2.6%
1966	103	−8.8%
1971	112	+8.7%
1979	97	−13.4%
1981	89	−8.2%

Year	Pop.	±%
1986	69	−22.5%
1991	51	−26.1%
1996	48	−5.9%
2002	39	−18.8%
2006	24	−38.5%
2011	25	+4.2%
2016	18	−28.0%
2022	12	−33.3%

Source: Central Statistics Office. "CNA17: Population by Off Shore Island, Sex and Year". irishislands.info.

== See also ==
- Nevins
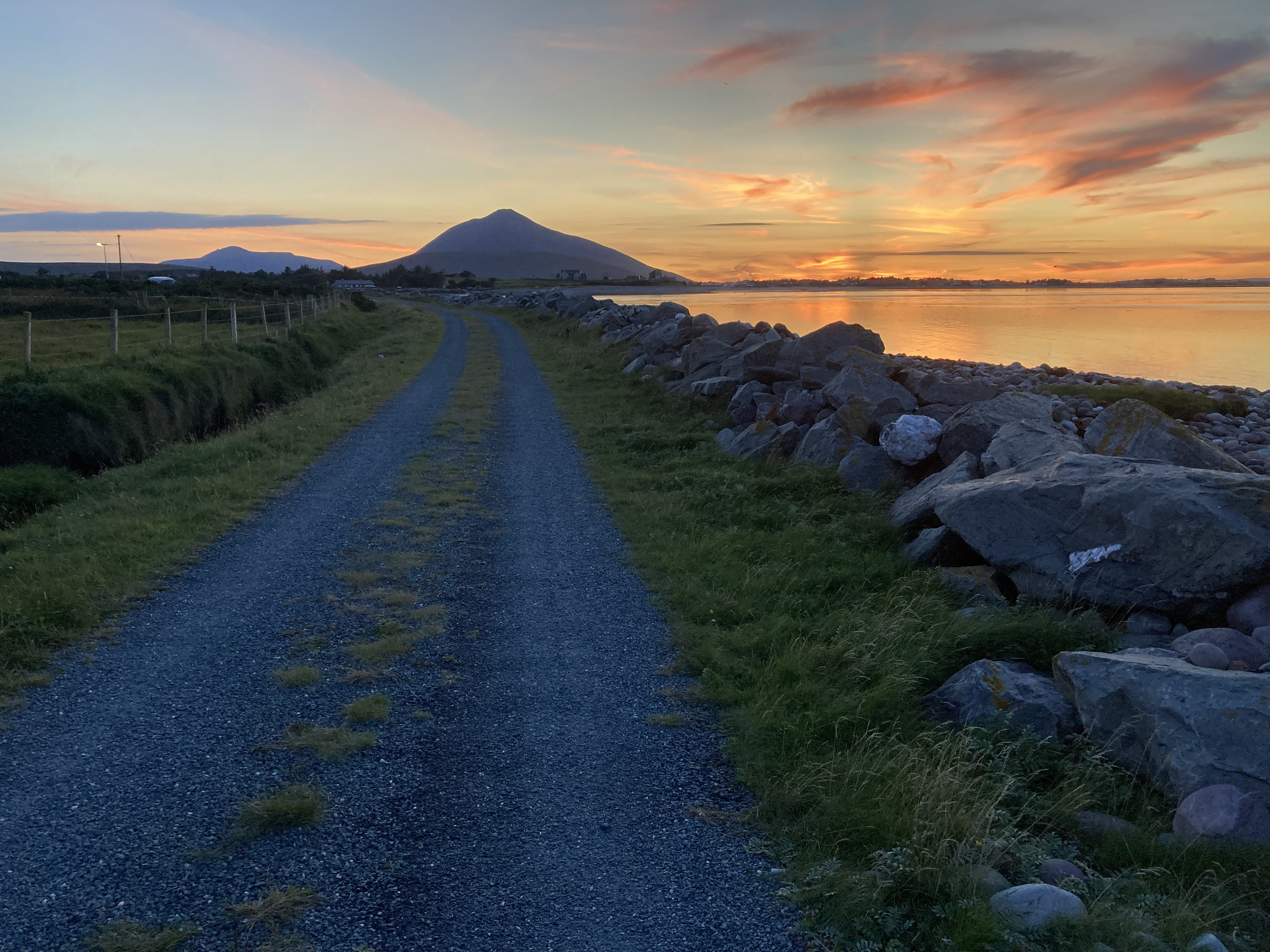
- Potato Labour Scandal 1971
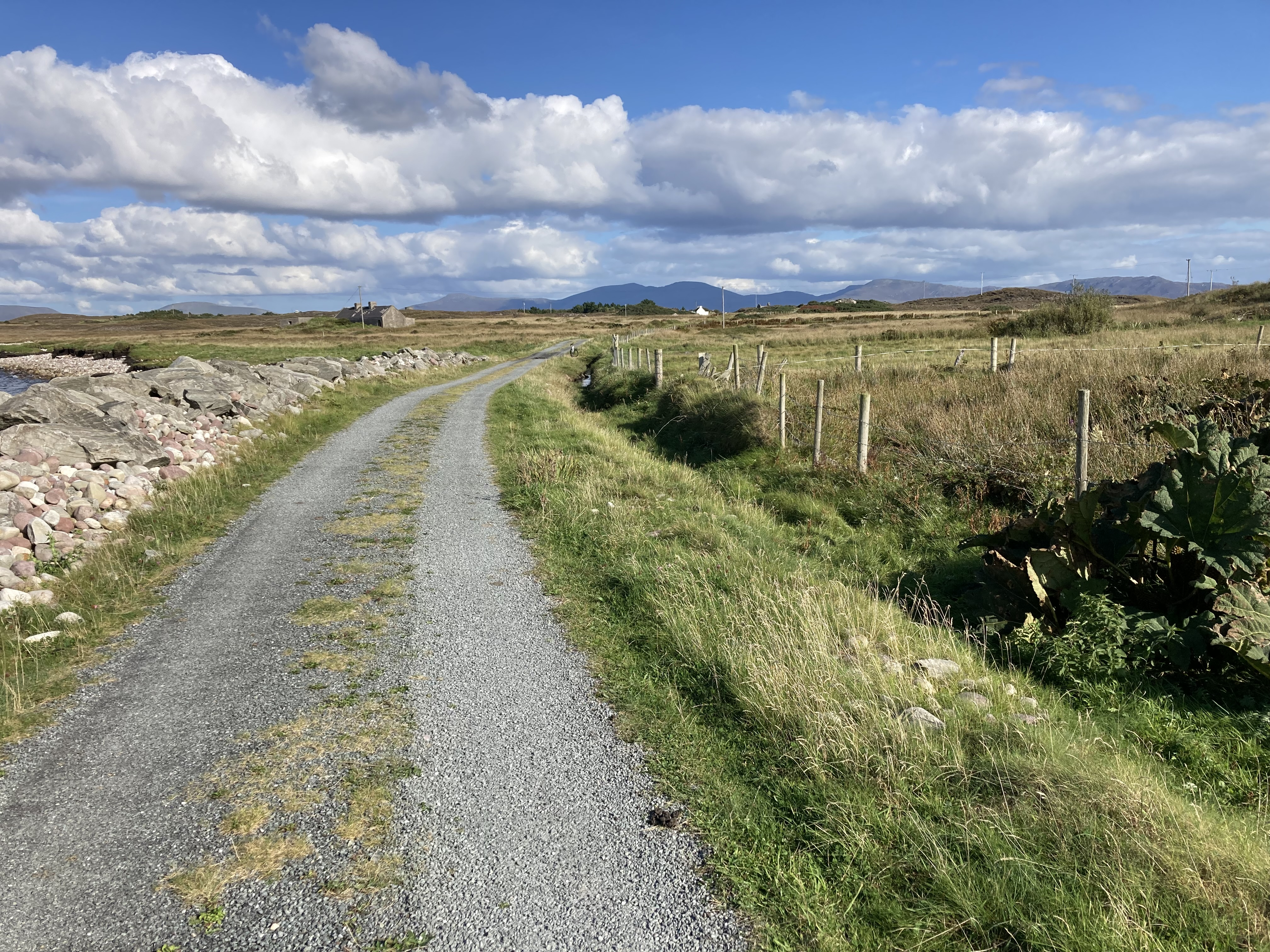
- Ulster Scots dialects
