= Tóin an tSeanbhaile =

Tóin an tSeanbhaile Tonatanvally
- Village
- Location in Ireland
- Coordinates: 54°00′44″N 9°58′02″W
- Country: Ireland
- Province: Connacht
- County: County Mayo
- Elevation: 0 m (0 ft)
- Time zone: UTC+0 (WET)
  - Summer (DST): UTC-1 (IST (WEST))
- Irish Grid Reference: L709089

Tóin an tSeanbhaile (Traditionally: Tóin a'tSean-bhaile, colloquial English: the Valley/Tonatanvally) is a small village located on the north east point of Achill Island, Ireland. It lies within the Mayo Gaeltacht.

== Geography ==
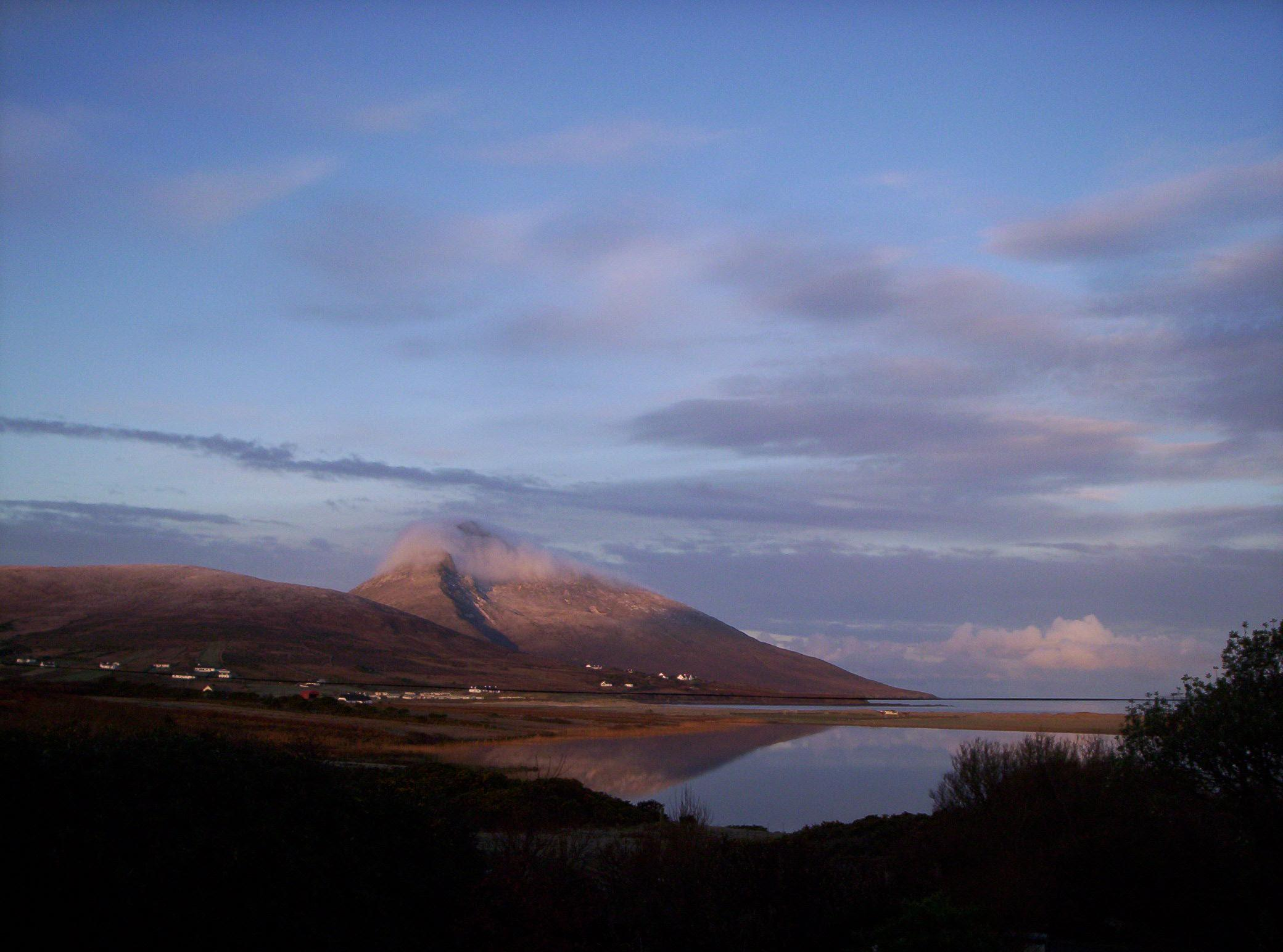
Sliabh Mór from Tóin an tSeanbhaile village

Tóin an tSeanbhaile is one of the flattest places on Achill Island, a shallow plain encircled by low hills which is bordered mostly by the sea, with Ridge Point to the north, and Sruhill Lough to the south. To the southeast lies the village of Dún Ibhir (Dooniver), to the west lies Dúmha Goirt (Dugort) and to the south lies Bun an Churraigh (Bunacurry).

The bedrock of the area consists mainly of Schist and Gneiss, with lowland blanket bog to the south, and machair and rocky seashore to the north and west. The area has a number of lakes, Lough Gall (Loch Geall, 'the bright lake'), Loch na mBreac ('the lake of the trout'), Lough Doo (Loch Dubh, 'the black lake') and Sruhill Lough ('a tidal lake'). These lakes have healthy stocks of brown trout, some sea trout, and Lough Gall is also artificially stocked with rainbow trout.

A machair exists near Lough Doo, which has been designated a Special Area of Conservation by the National Parks and Wildlife Service, under the European Habitats Directive. The site itself is of international importance in the conservation of mosses and liverworts, with some scarce and rare species, Catoscopium nigritum and Fossombronia incurva, and is in fact the only location in Ireland that the liverwort Leiocolea gillmannii has been recorded at.

Much of the southern townland was designated a Natural Heritage Area by Minister for the Environment, Dick Roche, in 2007 due to its importance as a hyperoceanic blanket bog habitat.

== History ==
Tóin an tSeanbhaile is one of the oldest settlements on Achill island, as evidenced by its name (Tóin an tSeanbhaile 'the end of the old village'), with a number of prehistoric archaeological sites, including a Cairn to the south of the village near Bun an Churraigh, a Midden, Ringfort and Enclosure on Caraun Point (where the first settlement existed), a Crannóg near the centre of the modern village.

A cillín, a burial ground for the unbaptised, mainly children, is also found on Caraun point, and which gives it its Irish name Rinn na Leanbh.

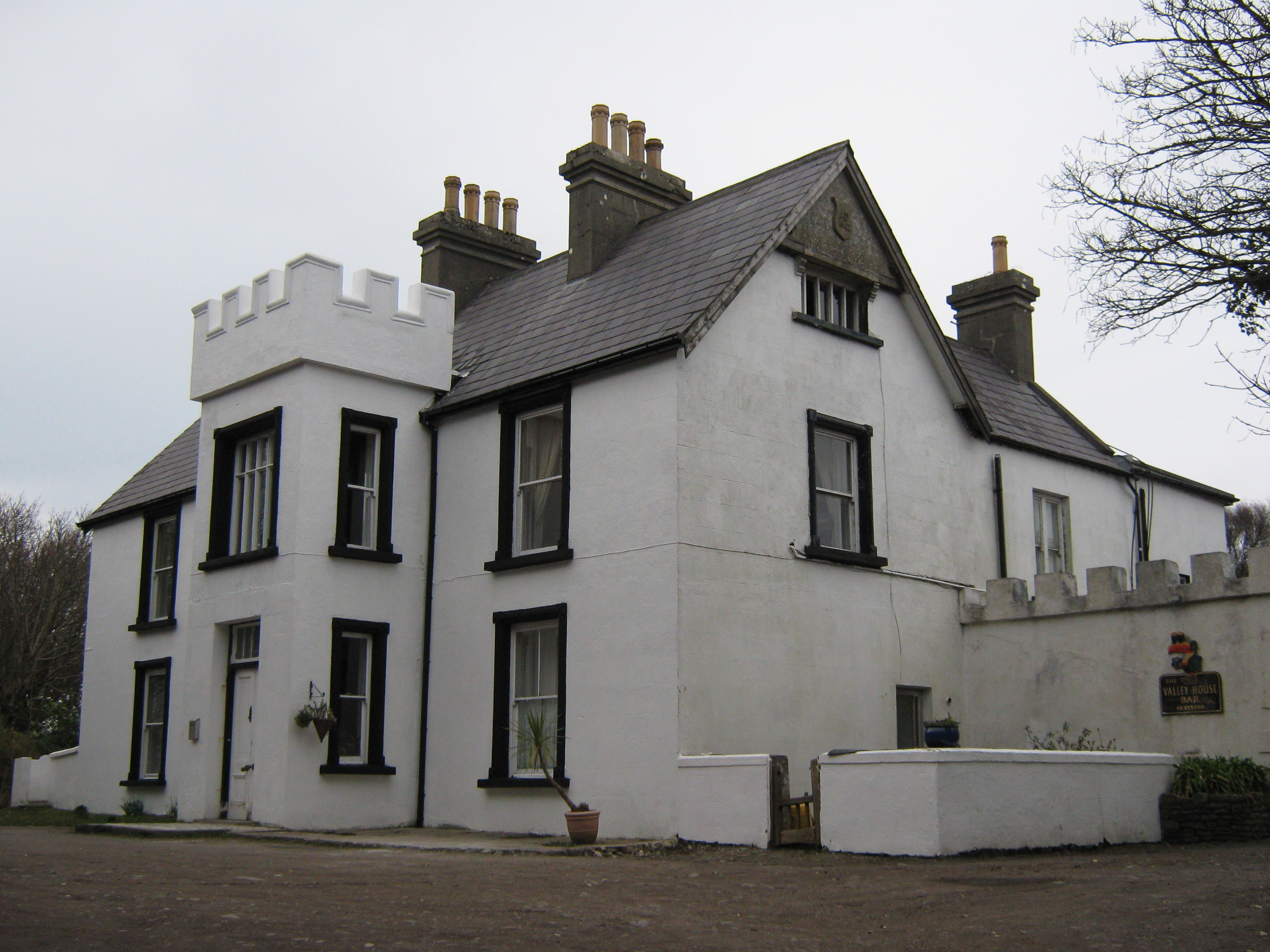
The Valley House as it currently stands. Visible at the top of the gable is the plaque showing the year of construction (AD1902).

John Goodacre sold the 1,900 acres (7.7 km^{2}) of land around Tóin an tSeanbhaile which had been bought by his father, Frederick Lambart, 8th Earl of Cavan in the early 1870s. Lambart built a hunting lodge on this land. In 1888, his wife (Caroline, the Countess of Cavan) sold the land to Mrs Agnes MacDonnell. Mrs MacDonnell and the estate became national and international news in October 1894, when Mrs MacDonnell was savagely attacked by her employee James Lynchehaun (c. 1864–1937) and left for dead after he set fire to her home at Valley House. His arrests and subsequent escapes were reported in the media, and became part of the popular culture of the era, with references to the attack in J.M. Synge's The Playboy of the Western World and James Joyce's Ulysses (1922).

The house was subsequently rebuilt by MacDonnell (who died in 1923, forced to wear a veil when in public due to her facial disfigurement) and completed in 1902. The estate was purchased from the MacDonnell family by the Gallagher family in 1942. It currently operates as a bar and hostel. In later years, the story of Mrs MacDonnell and Lynchehaun became the subject of fiction, with a book, The Playboy and the Yellow Lady, was published in 1986. The Veiled Woman of Achill published in 2012 A 1998 film, Love and Rage, starring Daniel Craig as Lynchehaun, and Greta Scacchi as Agnes MacDonnell, was made.

The 1911 census showed a population of 253, which has declined today to an estimated population of 113.

Census data for Tóin an tSeanbhaile, 1841–1911
| Year | 1841 | 1851 | 1861 | 1871 | 1881 | 1891 | 1901 | 1911 |
|---|---|---|---|---|---|---|---|---|
| Number of Houses | 21 | 22 | 74 | 81 | 84 | 55 | 43 | 46 |
| Population | 115 | 96 | 334 | 381 | 413 | 274 | 232 | 253 |

== Wildlife ==
Tóin an tSeanbhaile has a broad diversity of wildlife. Marine mammals (whales, porpoises) and basking shark are commonly sighted off Ridge point, and the area is well known for its diversity of mosses and liverworts. Common birdsfoot trefoil, ladys bedstraw, various small sedges and sand sedge are found on the Machair near Loch Dubh, and Loch na mBreac has a good growth of common reed, branched bur-reed and bulrush.

Birds commonly sighted on the shore include cormorants, shags, snipe, lapwing, oystercatcher, common tern, Arctic tern, Sandwich tern, common gull, kittiwake, black-headed gull, great black-backed gull, lesser black-backed gull, herring gull. Further inshore, species commonly sighted include whooper swan, wigeon, teal, mallard, coot, lapwing, curlew, little grebe, grey heron, red-breasted merganser and light-bellied brent goose. From time to time the rare corn crake has nested inland also.

The blanket bog to the south has a large biodiversity of flora, including black bog-rush, purple moor-grass, cross-leaved heath, ling heather, white beak-sedge, common cottongrass, deergrass, round-leaved sundew, lousewort, bog mosses (Sphagnum spp.), lichens (Cladonia spp.), Racomitrium lanuginosum, liverwort Pleurozia purpurea is also present. There are hollows colonised by bog asphodel (Narthecium ossifragum) and moss Campylopus atrovirens and the bog moss Sphagnum contortum also occurs. A report on the area by the National Parks and Wildlife service further details

The lake in the south-east corner of the site supports pipewort (Eriocaulon aquaticum), bogbean (Menyanthes trifoliata) and bulbous rush (Juncus bulbosus) and a marginal flush that is extensive in parts. The flush contains bog mosses Sphagnum recurvum and S. cuspidatum, carnation sedge (Carex panicea), marsh pennywort (Hydrocotyle vulgaris), oblong-leaved sundew (Drosera intermedia), yellow iris (Iris pseudacorus) and many-stalked spike-rush (Eleocharis multicaulis). The slopes of the low-rising hills to the west of the site support a mosaic of blanket bog and dry heath. Species noted include ling heather, devil's-bit scabious (Succisa pratensis), hard fern (Blechnum spicant) and the lichens Cladonia uncialis and C. portentosa.

— National Parks and Wildlife service, Site Synopsis of the Natural Heritage Area Doogort East bog

== Amenities ==
Although a small village, Tóin an tSeanbhaile has a number of amenities, including a primary school (S.N Thóin a'tSeanbhaile, built 1914), soccer pitch (Fr. O'Brien Park, home ground of Achill Rovers, a Roman Catholic church, a pier and blue flag beaches, a pitch and putt course, as well as a bar and hostel. The village has one postbox, one bus stop and is served by the Bus Éireann 440 once a day in each direction.
