= Ballycroy =

Ballycroy may refer to:

- Ballycroy, Ontario, a community in Adjala-Tosorontio township
- Ballycroy National Park
- Ballycroy, County Mayo, a village in the Republic of Ireland
