= Slieve Carr =

Mountain in County Mayo, Ireland

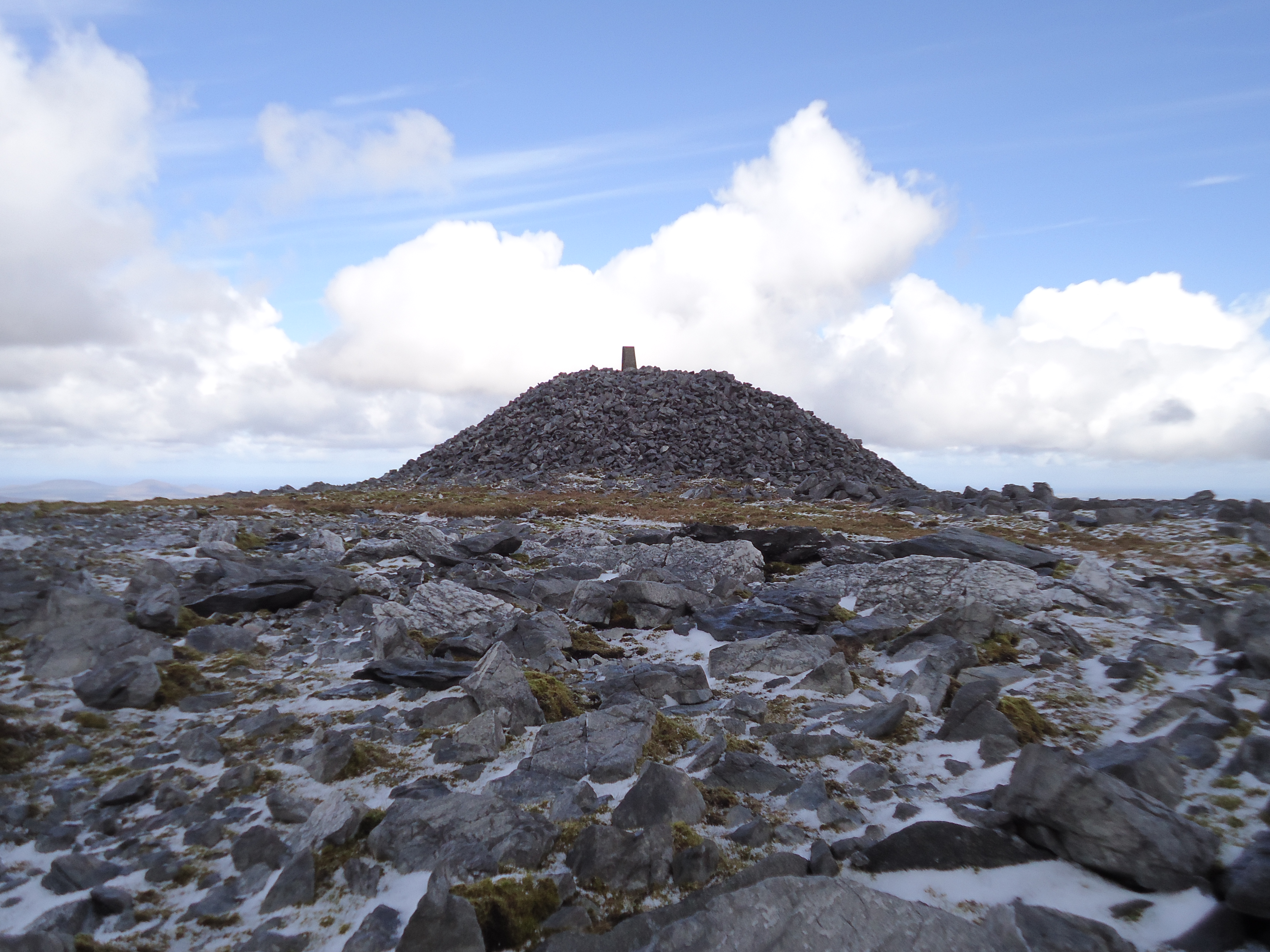
- Cairn at summit

Highest point
- Elevation: 721 m (2,365 ft)
- Prominence: 646 m (2,119 ft)
- Listing: Vandeleur-Lynam
- Coordinates: 54.068°N 9.657°W

Naming
- Native name: Corrshliabh

Geography
- Location within island of Ireland
- Location: County Mayo, Ireland
- Parent range: Nephin Beg Range
- OSI/OSNI grid: F915145

Slieve Carr, also known as Slieve Cor or Corslieve (Irish: Corrshliabh, meaning 'conspicuous mountain'), is a mountain with a height of 721 metres (2,365 ft) in County Mayo, Ireland. It is part of the Nephin Range and is beside Nephin Beg. The mountain is in Wild Nephin National Park and it is the most remote point of land on the Irish mainland.

Slieve Carr is a long mountain running north–south, with several small lakes on its eastern slopes. On the summit is a burial cairn known as Laghtdauhybaun, from Leacht Dáithí Bháin, 'burial monument of white Dáithí'. This is believed to refer to Dathí, a king of Connacht in the 5th century.

== See also ==
- Lists of mountains in Ireland
- List of P600 mountains in the British Isles
- List of Marilyns in the British Isles
- List of Hewitt mountains in England, Wales and Ireland
