= Birreencorragh =

Mountain in County Mayo, Ireland

- Birín Corrach
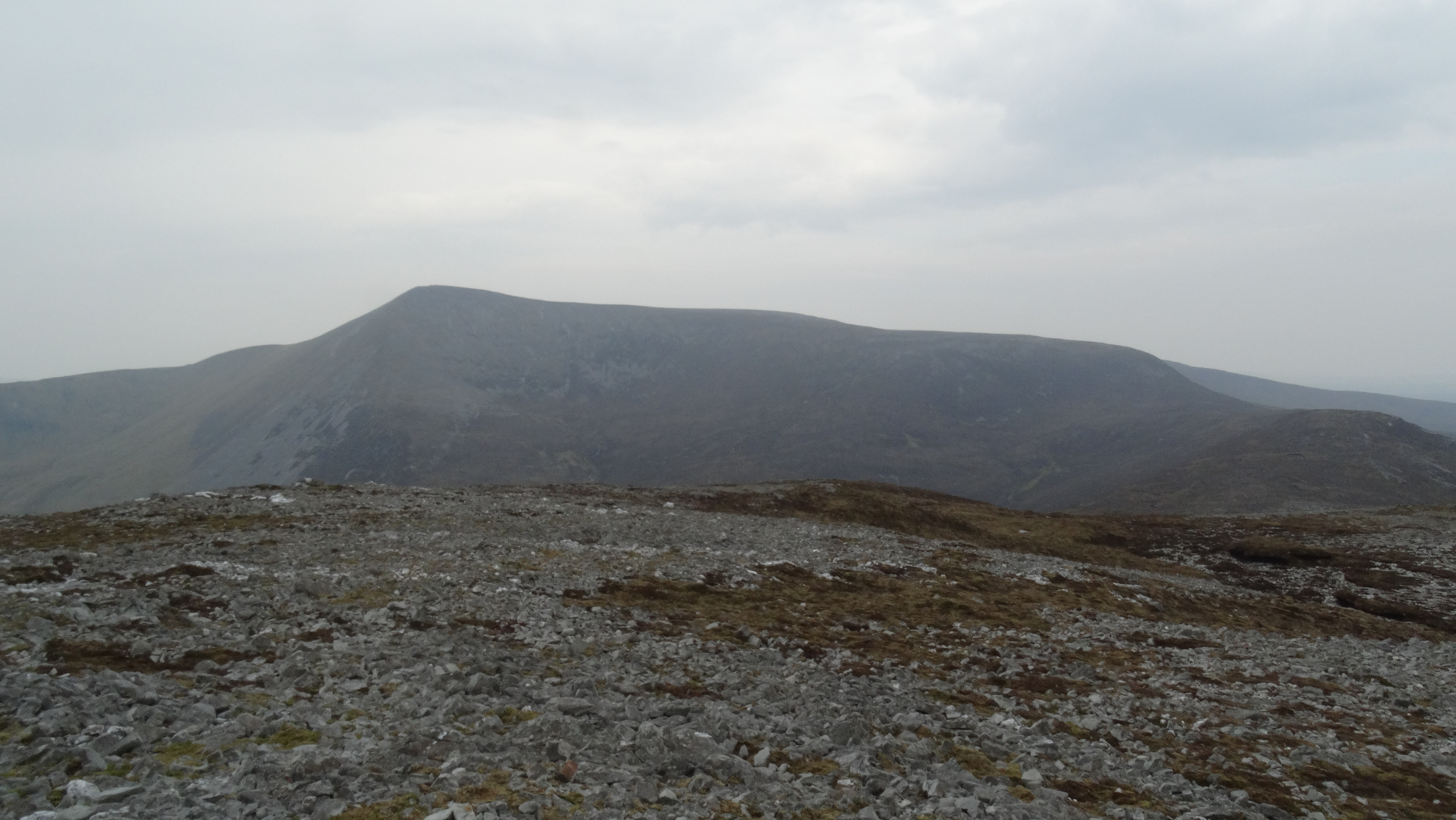
- Birreencorragh seen from Knockaffertagh

Highest point
- Elevation: 698 m (2,290 ft)
- Prominence: 583 m (1,913 ft)
- Listing: Marilyn, Hewitt
- Coordinates: 53°59′7″N 9°29′16″W

Naming
- English translation: rocky little spike
- Language of name: Irish

Geography
- Location within Ireland
- Location: County Mayo, Ireland
- Parent range: Nephin Beg Range
- OSI/OSNI grid: G0245605007
- Topo map: OSi Discovery 23 / 31

Birreencorragh is a mountain in the Nephin Beg Range, County Mayo, Ireland, reaching 698 metres (2,290 ft) above sea level.

== Etymology ==
The name Birreencorragh derives from the Irish Birín Corrach, meaning "rocky little spike"; birín is found in very few Irish toponyms.

== Geography ==
The mountain is separated from nearby mountains, such as Glennamong and Nephin Beg in the west and Nephin in the east, by deep depressions. It makes a good viewpoint of the Nephin Beg Range.

== See also ==
- List of mountains in Ireland
