= Ella MacMahon =

Irish romance novelist

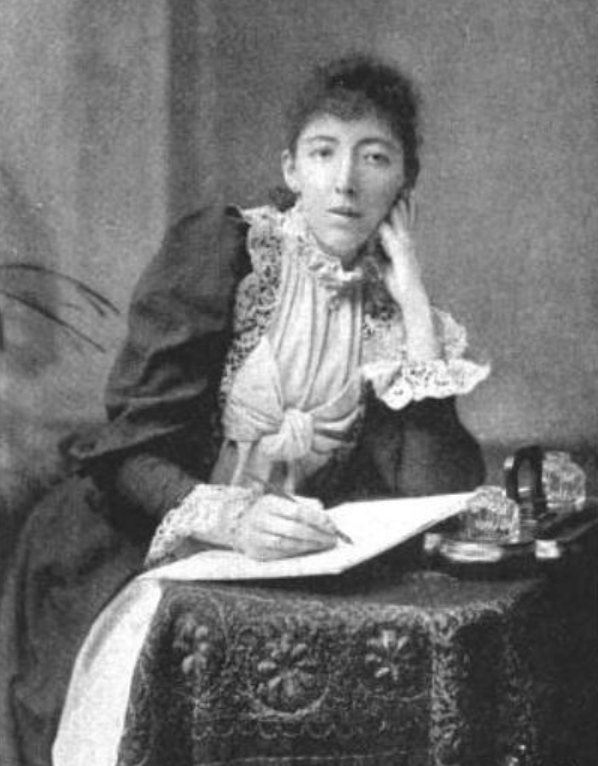
- In The Sketch, 28 November 1894
- Born: Eleanor Harriet MacMahon; 23 July 1864; Dublin, Ireland
- Died: 19 April 1956 (aged 91); United Kingdom
- Occupation: Writer
- Relatives: John Henry MacMahon (father)
- Writing career
- Genre: Novel

Eleanor Harriet MacMahon (23 July 1864 – 19 April 1956) was a prolific Irish romance novelist.

== Early life ==
Ella MacMahon was born to Rev. John Henry MacMahon, curate of St. Werburgh's Church, Dublin and Frances Snagge on 23 July 1864 in Dublin. She was the older of their two children. Her father later worked as chaplain of Mountjoy Prison. Rev. MacMahon was on the board of religious education of the Church of Ireland as well as editor of the Irish Ecclesiastical Gazette. He wrote four books. His daughter was educated at home and had similar interests in a literary career.

== Career ==
In her twenties, MacMahon began contributing to periodicals such as the New Ireland Review, and her first novel was published in 1894. Her best-known books were A New Note (1894) and A Modern Man (1895). In addition to fiction, she wrote Hints on Letter-Writing (1884), based on a French guide, and "Is Humor Declining?", an essay in The Living Age.

While her main income was from her novels, MacMahon worked for various government departments including the new Intelligence department during World War I.

== Reception ==
A reviewer in Godey's wrote that McMahon's A Pitiless Passion "is in no sense a great work, but it is an unusual and an absorbing story told with a good eye for contrasts." "Miss MacMahon can write very pleasantly, and knows just how much detail of dress and furniture is interesting to her readers," explained a reviewer in 1898. "She makes no attempt to avoid femininity, and succeeds none the worse on that account."

== Personal life ==
In the post-war years MacMahon moved to Brockenhurst, Hampshire, and later retired on her government pension. At some point in her life, she converted to Catholicism. She died 19 April 1956.

== Bibliography ==
- A New Note: A Novel, 2 vols. (London: Hutchinson & Co. 1894)
- A Modern Man, with illustrations by Ida Lovering (London: Dent 1895), 192pp.; Do. (NY: Macmillan 1895), 192pp.
- A Pitiless Passion (London: London: Hutchinson 1896), 348pp.
- The Touchstone of Life (London: Hutchinson & Co. 1897), 366pp. [printed Nimeguen, Holland: H. C. A. Thieme]; Do. (Dublin: Mellifont Press [1947]), 160pp.
- An Honourable Estate: A Tale (London: Hutchinson & Co. 1898), 351pp., and Do. [new rev. edn.] (London: Mills & Boon Ltd., [1918]), 319pp.
- Heathcote: A Novel, 2 vols. ([q. pub.] 1899)
- Fortune's Yellow: A Novel (London: Hutchinson & Co. 1900), 364pp.
- Such as Have Erred (London: Hutchinson & Co. 1902), 367pp. [Printed London & Aylesbury: Hazell, Watson & Viney]
- Jemima (London: Chapman and Hall 1903), 329pp.;
- The Other Son (London: Chapman & Hall 1904), vi, 345pp., 8°, and Do. [abridg.] (Dublin: Mellifont Press [1945]), 96pp.
- Oxendale (London: 1905)
- The Heart's Banishment (London: Chapman & Hall 1907), 314pp.
- The Court of Conscience (London: Chapman & Hall 1908), [8], 312pp.
- Fancy O’Brien (London: Chapman & Hall 1909), 314pp.; Do. [abridg.] (Dublin: Mellifont Press [1946]), 128pp.
- Straits of Poverty: A Study of Temperament (London: Chapman & Hall 1911), 365pp.
- An Elderly Person and Some Others (London: Chapman & Hall 1913), 287pp.
- Divine Folly (London: Chapman & Hall 1913), 320pp.
- The Job (London: James Nisbet & Co. 1914), 383pp.
- A Rich Man's Table: A Comedy of Values (London: Missl & Boon [1916]), 310pp.
- John Fitzhenry: A Study (London: Mills & Boon 1920), 308pp., and Do. [abridg.] (Dublin: Mellifont Press [1945]), 128pp.
- Mercy and Truth: A Novel (London: Mills & Boon 1923), 283pp.
- Wind of Dawn (London: John Lane, The Bodley Head 1927), [8], 320pp.
- Irish Vignettes (London: J. Lane, The Bodley Head 1928), 279pp.
