= Sraheens, Achill Island =

Townland in County Mayo, Ireland

Coordinates: 53°55′30.5″N 9°58′48.7″W

Sraheens (Irish: Na Sraithíní) is a townland and boggy area on the island of Achill, County Mayo, Ireland, to the southwest of Achill Sound. The townland, in the southeastern part of Achill, belongs to the barony of Burrishoole in Achill Parish and has an area of 895.47 hectares (8.9547 square kilometres (3.4574 sq mi)). It borders Cashel to the west, Derreen to the south, Dooega to the west and Salia to the north.

Sraheens Bog is officially designated a Natural Heritage Area (NHA). It lies about 3 kilometres (1.9 mi) west of Achill Sound and 3 kilometres (1.9 mi) east of Dooega, on the eastern slopes of Knockmore Mountain. Sraheens Lough lies to the north and to the east is a rocky ridge and the Sraheens River. The altitude ranges from 166 metres (545 ft) to 266 metres (873 ft).

The landscape of the townland and bog is dominated mainly by Black Bog-rush (Schoenus nigricans) and Purple Moor-grass (Molinia caerulea), along with Carnation Sedge (Carex panicea), Ling Heather (Calluna vulgaris), Cross-leaved Heath (Erica tetralix), Bog Asphodel (Narthecium ossifragum), Round-leaved Sundew (Drosera rotundifolia), Many-stalked Spike-rush (Eleocharis multicaulis), Deergrass (Scirpus cespitosus), and Common Cottongrass (Eriophorum angustifolium) . Isoetes echinospora and Leptobryum pyriforme grow in the area around Sraheens Lough.
