= Patricia Byrne =

Patricia Byrne may refer to:

- Patricia Byrne (writer) (born 1950), Irish writer
- Patricia M. Byrne (1925–2007), American diplomat
- Patsy Byrne (1933–2014), English actress
