= Patricia Byrne (writer) =

Irish writer

- Born: Bridget Patricia Murphy; 1950 (age 75–76); Bekan, County Mayo, Ireland
- Education: NUI Galway, University of Limerick, Maynooth University
- Occupation: Writer
- Spouse: Michael Byrne (m. 1980)
- Children: 2
- Writing career
- Period: 2007–present

Bridget Patricia Byrne (née Murphy; born 1950) is an Irish writer of narrative nonfiction. Two of her books deal with historical events in nineteenth-century Achill Island.

== Biography ==
Byrne was born in the townland of Greenwood, in the parish of Bekan, County Mayo, in 1950. She attended Bekan National School and St Louis Secondary School in Balla, County Mayo. She holds a BA from Maynooth University.

She worked as a civil servant in the Irish public service in Dublin. She moved to Limerick in 1980 and worked as an enterprise development executive, and later as an executive director, with Shannon Development - a regional economic development agency for the Mid-West region of Ireland. She was awarded a Master’s in Business Studies by the University of Limerick in 1996. She also holds an MA from NUI Galway.

== Works ==
Byrne has published three books, two in the narrative nonfiction genre based on historical events on Achill Island.

Her book The Preacher and The Prelate: The Achill Mission Colony and the Battle for Souls in Famine Ireland published by Merrion Press in 2018 recounts the story of Edward Nangle and his nineteenth century Achill Mission Colony. The narrative traces the evolution of Edward Nangle’s vision for an evangelising colony from his days as a young clergyman in Cavan at the time of the Second Reformation, through the charges of souperism against his Achill colony in the Great Famine years, on to the period when the Achill Mission became the largest landlord on Achill Island.

The Veiled Woman of Achill: Island Outrage and A Playboy Drama (Collins Press, 2012) recounts the story of an infamous crime on Achill Island in 1894, when James Lynchehaun attacked the English landlord, Agnes MacDonnell, causing facial disfigurement, and burnt her home - the Valley House. (The Valley House is located in the north east of Achill Island in a townland known as The Valley or Tóin an tSeanbhaile). The narrative relates how James Lynchehaun attracted notoriety following two spectacular escapes from custody and became an Irish folklore figure. There is an account of the ground breaking legal case in the United States in 1903 when Lynchehaun successfully resisted extradition. Following the Abbey Theatre riots of 1907 around the performance of The Playboy of the Western World, the writer John Millington Synge admitted that Lynchehaun and the ‘Aran case’ of O Máille had influenced him in writing the play.

Byrne’s poetry collection Unstable Time was published by Lapwing Press in 2009.

=== Awards ===
Byrne’s essay Milk Bottles in Limerick was named as one of the Notable Essays of the Year in The Best American Essays 2017. She won the Dromineer Poetry Prize (2007) and was shortlisted for a CUIRT annual award (2007). She was a prize winner in the Unbound Press First Chapters competition (2010).

== Bibliography ==
=== Narrative nonfiction ===
- The Preacher and The Prelate - The Achill Mission Colony and The Battle for Souls in Famine Ireland (2018) ISBN 978-17-8537-172-1; ISBN 1-78537-172-X
- The Veiled Woman of Achill - Island Outrage and A Playboy Drama (2012) ISBN 978-18-4889-147-0; ISBN 1-84889-147-4

=== Poetry ===
- Unstable Time (2009) ISBN 978-19-0727-617-0
