= The Church of Ireland Gazette =

Monthly magazine covering the Church of Ireland

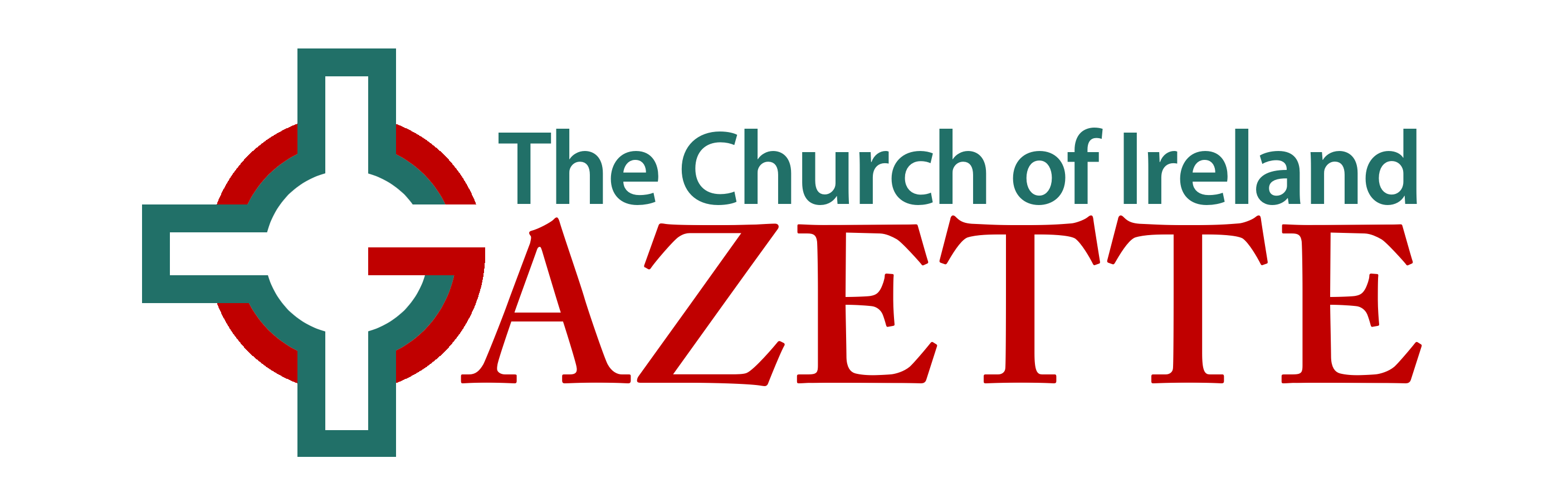
- Type: Monthly religion-orientated magazine
- Format: Compact
- Owner: Church of Ireland Press
- Editor: Clark Brydon
- Deputy editor: Aoife Deasy
- Former name: The Irish Ecclesiastical Gazette
- Founded: March 1, 1856; 170 years ago
- Headquarters: Lisburn, County Antrim
- Website: coigazette.ie

The Church of Ireland Gazette is a monthly magazine covering news, commentary, and faith-based reflection from across the Church of Ireland. Though rooted in the Anglican tradition, it maintains full editorial independence. It is published by Church of Ireland Press on the second Friday of each month, with both print and digital editions, and an approximate circulation of 5,000 copies.

== History ==
Founded in March 1856 under the title The Irish Ecclesiastical Gazette, the publication began as a monthly journal. It became a weekly newspaper in 1880 and was renamed The Church of Ireland Gazette in 1900. In January 2019, it reverted to a monthly format and adopted a more reflective, magazine-style approach.

During the 19th and early 20th centuries, the Gazette operated from 61 Middle Abbey Street, Dublin, where it was printed by James Charles & Sons. A new company, Church of Ireland Printing and Publishing Ltd., was formed in 1897. The paper remained at Middle Abbey Street until the 1960s. It notably continued through national crises, including the 1916 Easter Rising—although publication was suspended for one week, it resumed with a combined issue.

The Irish Church Directory, later published as The Church of Ireland Directory, was also produced from the same address between 1862 and 1966, before moving to Mark Street, Dublin.

== Recent developments ==
In 2025, Clark Brydon was appointed editor and announced plans to modernise the magazine. His editorial vision includes a renewed emphasis on investigative journalism, deeper theological engagement, and broader coverage of social, cultural, and ethical issues from a Church of Ireland perspective.

As part of its ongoing evolution, the Gazette continues to balance historical awareness with contemporary relevance, contributing to public discourse within and beyond the Church.

== Editors ==
The editors of the Gazette have included clergy, journalists, and academics. The list below presents editors in chronological order:

Name	Tenure	Notes
Revd John Henry MacMahon [M'Mahon]	1864–c.1867	Metaphysicist and barrister
Revd James Anderson Carr	1871–1893	Legal editor - William Leigh Bernard (1883-?)
Revd Canon Courtenay Moore	1893–1897	
Revd Canon Charles Irvine Graham	1897–1905	
Revd Warre B. Wells	1906–1918	Wrote the wartime column The War Week by Week
Revd George Ashton Chamberlain	1919–1924	
Revd Canon Hugh W. B. Thompson	1924–1930	
Revd Canon Ernest William Greening	1934–1954	
Revd Canon Frederick Andrew Graves (Andy) Willis	1959–1975	Joint editor 1963–1966
Rt Revd Gilbert Wilson	1963–1966	Joint editor with Andy Willis
Revd Houston McKelvey	1975–1982	Later Dean of Belfast
Revd Canon Cecil Cooper	1982–2001	
Revd Canon Ian M. Ellis	2001–2017	
Revd Earl Storey	2017–2019	
Ms Karen Bushby	2019–2020	First female editor
Ms Emma Blain	2020–2024	Journalist and communications professional
Mr Clark Brydon	2025–present	Current editor; introduced a focus on modernisation.

Notable contributors have included Frances Condell, the first female Mayor of Limerick.

== Archives and digitisation ==
The complete physical archive of the Gazette is held at the Representative Church Body Library, Braemor Park, Dublin. In 2018, issues from 1856 to 1923 were digitised and made available online as part of the Decade of Centenaries initiative, with support from the Department of Culture, Heritage and the Gaeltacht. Digital access is provided via the Informa eSearch platform.

== See also ==
- Church of Ireland
- Representative Church Body Library
- Anglicanism

== Other Church of Ireland publications ==
- The Irish Church Advocate (founded 1836)
- Achill Missionary Herald and Western Witness (1837–1869)
- Braemor Studies, published by Church of Ireland Publishing and the Church of Ireland Theological Institute
