= Nephin Beg Range =

Mountain range in Ireland

Nephin Mountains
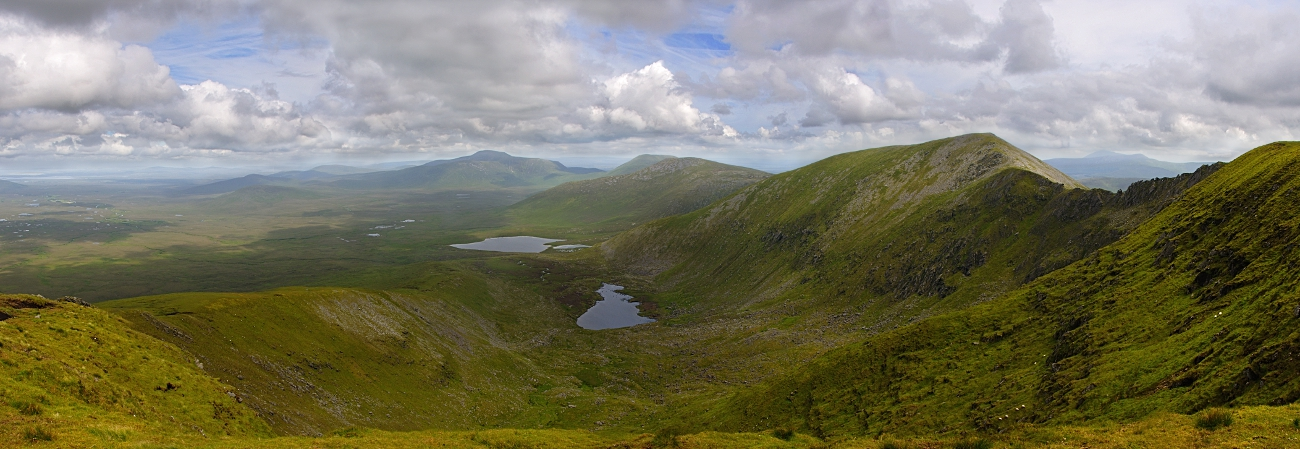
- Part of the Nephin range from Corranabinnia

Highest point
- Peak: Slieve Carr
- Elevation: 721 m (2,365 ft)

Geography
- Country: Ireland
- Provinces of Ireland: Connacht

The Nephin Beg Range (pronounced 'NAY-FINN') (Irish: Néifinn Bheag), or Nephin Mountains is a mountain range in County Mayo, Ireland. The range contains the mountains of Slieve Carr (its highest peak), Nephin Beg, Birreencorragh and Corranabinnia/Cushcamcarragh, among others. The range hosts the Nephin forest, a 4,843 hectares former commercial forest now managed by Wild Nephin National Park.

Much of the range has come under the ownership of the NPWS in 2018, and is in the process of becoming Ireland's first designated wilderness area, a continuing long-term project of restoring biodiversity and the natural envrionment as well as developing walking trails, huts and cottages recreational hiking and camping. The wilderness, when finished, is due to cover 16,000 hectares of Wild Nephin National Park land.
