= Frances Condell =

First woman Mayor of Limerick city

- Born: Frances Eades; 29 June 1916; Limerick, Ireland
- Died: 10 November 1986 (aged 70); Limerick, Ireland
- Known for: First woman Mayor of Limerick city
- Spouse: Robert Condell
- Children: 1

Frances Condell (née Eades; 29 June 1916 – 10 November 1986) was the first woman Mayor of Limerick city. She was first elected in 1963 and was the only woman to serve two terms in the city.

== Early life ==
Born Frances Eades on 29 June 1916 Limerick to James Eades and his wife. She was their sixth child but the first daughter. She was educated in St Michael's National School, Barrington Street. She went on to Villiers School and from there to the teacher training college in Coláiste Moibhí. After completing her training there Condell went on to graduate BA from Trinity College Dublin. She returned to her own secondary school as a teacher from 1955 until 1959. When the Shannon Free Airport Development Company was set up Condell worked as the welfare officer to help families settle into the area. She took a new role as public relations officer for Guinness Ireland on a part-time basis in 1964.

== Political career ==
In 1960 Condell was convinced to enter local politics, and she joined the Limerick City Council as the representative of the Ratepayers Association. In 1962, she was elected mayor of Limerick for 1963 and again in 1964. She gained notability when she managed to convince President John F. Kennedy to stop in Limerick city on his Ireland tour to accept Freedom of the city. She also received Senator Edward Kennedy, President Kaunda of Zambia, Cardinal Browne, and Lady Bird Johnson, wife of President Lyndon B. Johnson.

== Personal life ==
She married Robert Condell and they had one son, Alan. She had health problems and retired from politics in 1967. Condell also had poetry published in and worked as a journalist for the Limerick Echo, The Church of Ireland Gazette, Woman's Way and the Irish Independent. She died in 1986.
