= Askill =

Village in Ireland

- Settlement
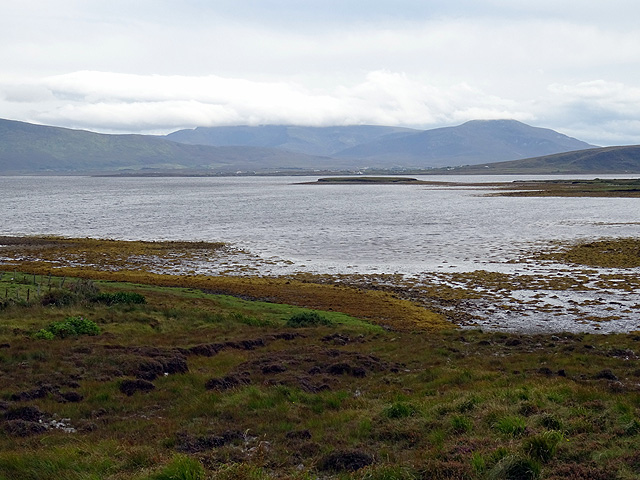
- Breanaskill Inlet and Achill Sound
- Interactive map of Askill
- Coordinates: 53.987°N 9.960°W
- Country: Ireland
- County: County Mayo

Askill or Breanaskil (Irish: An Ascaill) is a small Gaeltacht area in Achill, County Mayo, Ireland. It is within the townland of Bunacurry, close to the townland of Dooniver.
