= Dugort =

Village in County Mayo, Ireland

Dugort Dumha Goirt Doogort
- Village
- Dugort beach

- Location in Ireland
- Coordinates: 54°00′35″N 10°01′30″W
- Country: Ireland
- Province: Connacht
- County: County Mayo

Dugort (Irish: Dumha Goirt, meaning 'sandbank of the field'), sometimes spelled Doogort, is a historical village on Achill Island in County Mayo, Ireland. It is next to Slievemore mountain. There are two blue flag beaches in Dugort: Silver Strand which is located at the foot of the Slievemore Mountain and the Golden Strand which is located further east.

== History ==
Dugort is the site of the 19th century planned Church of Ireland mission overseen by Reverend Edward Nangle. It consisted of a square of houses, with 56 families, with larger houses, a printing business, schools, an orphanage, grain mill and woolen factory added later. It was part of a wider movement by evangelicals to convert Catholics in the West of Ireland to the Protestant faith. They aimed to be self-sufficient but relied heavily on voluntary subscriptions from Protestants in Ireland and abroad.

=== Missionary settlement ===
The Achill missionary also known as 'colony' was set up on the base of the Slievemore mountain, in the village of Dugort in the early 1830s by Nangle, who was given 130 acres of land by Sir Richard O'Donnell on the island at Dugort to build his mission. He describes the land as “a swamp so soft a hare could not walk over it”.

When Nangle and his family arrived the area in August 1834, it was described as having two small houses – one for the steward and the schoolmaster and the other for Nangle and his family - and two more under construction. The accommodation was described as very limited. Food was scarce and had to be produced. There was no meat on the island and Newport was the nearest market town, 25 miles away.

A monthly journal began in 1837 called the Achill Missionary Herald, which was the main form of communication for the Mission with Protestants in Ireland and abroad. This journal was edited by Edward Nangle and published for almost 40 years but unfortunately only 8 of the annual reports written by Nangle survived from the period between 1835-50. These reports gave a great insight into the work of the Achill Mission. In these annual reports, all subscriptions received were recorded and where the money went was also recorded.

The Mission received a considerable amount of abuse and intimidation from the Roman Catholic Church and many of its adherents. There are reports of threats made to the Mission and its supporters. There are records of schoolmasters and a scripture reader being assaulted. Shouting verbal abuse and threats to use or the actual use of a whip were also reported.

==== Further constructions and improvements ====
In the summer of 1833, a steward was appointed to oversee the building of new houses and the reclamation of land. The materials for the first buildings arrived to Dugort by boat. By 1835, a range of buildings had been constructed for the people involved in the work of the Mission. A church was built that was able to hold 130 people. A number of new houses were built to accommodate the growing population of people who were living in Dugort and supporting the Mission.

A small hotel now known as the Slievemore hotel was opened in 1839 to accommodate visitors of the mission. As the Mission became more popular, it struck curiosity in the public and brought many visitors to Dugort. Four new slated houses were built at this time as well as a small infirmary for the children of the area. The "Achill Orphan refuge/Orphan asylum" was set up in March 1838 to educate the orphan children of Roman Catholics, as Protestants.

After a failure of the potato crop in 1838, an appeal for funds was made by the Mission for relief of distress in Achill. This money was used to carry out a number of improvements on the island which included an excellent cart road which was 21 feet wide, a few hundred perches of drains were laid, about 100 perches of roads were repaired, cottages on the settlement were repaired, 12 English acres of land were reclaimed and a bridge was erected. The Mission created employment in Dugort. Daily employment was given to 140 people outside the settlement. This meant labourers didn’t have to be brought in from different parts of the country. The arrival of the printing press in the year 1835, where the Achill Herald was printed, was very important in the survival of the Mission.

A number of improvements were made to buildings in Dugort in 1844. Some of these included a slated cow-house which was added to the hospital, two two-roomed cottages were finished and a room was added to each of the houses of the steward and the printer. As result of the missionary settlement in Dugort a post office was opened which led to better communications to and from the Island.

By 1845, the missionary settlement was at the peak of its development at Dugort. A thriving village now lay where once there was nothing but a barren wasteland. This major improvement of the land had all been achieved in the space of 10 or 12 years.

==== Population ====
The 1841 census recorded the population of Dugort to be 319. The figures for 1842 show the population of Dugort was 420. This is an increase of 101 people in one year. The census of 1841 splits the area of Dugort into 3 divisions: Dugort, Dugort East and Dugort West. It is possible to say that the census gives accurate figures for the area of Dugort and can equate to those of the missionary settlement. There is a record of the number of baptisms and the number of burials in the parish. These figures are important as it shows the increase in population in the area. The number of baptisms of males between 1838 and 1845 was 49 and of girls was 32 bringing the total number of baptisms in Dugort to 82.

The number of males burials in Dugort between 1838 and 1845 was 13 compared to 6 females bringing the total number of burials to 19. Apart from two males aged 50 and 52, the ages given for the deaths ranged between 1–16 years. A possible explanation of this is that there were frequent outbreaks of illness that affected the death in the younger age group rather than the old.

==== Impact of the Great Famine ====
The potato blight arrived in Ireland in Autumn 1845, precipitating the Great Famine. The blight reached Achill in November. Many believed their potatoes were clear of this disease but when the pits were opened in February and March it was evident that the rot was widespread. Edward Nangle wrote in the Achill Herald in May 1846 that they would undertake to feed all the children in attendance at their schools. The food was sent by the government and was of excellent quality, however it was only available to those who could afford it or those too old or too sick to work.

In 1847, the famine increased in intensity throughout the country including in Achill. The Achill Herald reported that in December 1846, the Mission gave employment to 4,458 labourers, of which 2,006 were Roman Catholics. These figures appeared exceptionally high given the Achill population and Edward Nangle later clarified his claim, stating that these were 'aggregate' figures. The average daily employment figures at the Colony in that period appear to have been in the range 50-200. The Achill Mission gave 2 meals a day to over 600 children, of which 100 were orphans. Starvation was visible all over the island. People who said they endeavour "to starve the devils out of the island" were now employed on the Missions farm to receive money for whatever food they could afford. Dr. Adams reported that nearly all households were suffering from fever and dysentery. Many people on the island of Achill turned to the Mission to either save themselves or their children from starvation during the famine. The impact of the famine can be seen through the changes in population figures in the settlement at Dugort.

There was an increase of 16 inhabited houses in Dugort between 1841 and 1851 and the number of uninhabited houses decreased by 3. This may be due to migration into Dugort during the Famine. It is interesting to note the number of baptisms and burials in the Dugort area between 1838 and 1861. The number of baptisms from this period exceeded the number of burials by over 50%. The total baptisms between 1838 and 1861 was 182 and the number of burials was 77. The highest number of burials were recorded between 1847 and 1848 (a total of 16) which coincides with the Famine.

There were 102 recorded marriages in Dugort between 1845 and 1861. The highest number took place between 1844 and 1855 after which a drop in numbers occurred. The highest number of marriages took place in 1849 with 18 marriages and 32 in 1850. After this in 1851 and 1852 there was 14 marriages and in 1853 only 4 couples got married. Most people who married after the famine were in the 21-25 or 26-30 age groups. The decline in the number of marriages after the famine had a serious effect on the population of Dugort, leading to the re-evaluation of the future of the Mission.
