= Dooniver =

Dooniver Dún Ibhir
- Village
- Location in Ireland
- Coordinates: 53°59′46″N 9°56′55″W
- Country: Ireland
- Province: Connacht
- County: County Mayo

Area
  - Total: 3.16 km^{2} (1.22 sq mi)
- Elevation: 1 m (3.3 ft)
- Time zone: UTC+0 (WET)
  - Summer (DST): UTC-1 (IST (WEST))
- Irish Grid Reference: L709089
- Website: www.dooniver.com

Dún Ibhir (meaning "Ibhir's stronghold" or "Ibhir's fort", anglicised as Dooniver) is a townland and Gaeltacht village on Achill Island in County Mayo, Ireland.

== Geography ==
Dooniver is located on the east coast of Achill Island. Nearby areas include Askill, Tóin an tSeanbhaile (The Valley) and Bunnacurry. Geographical features within the townland of Dooniver include Bullsmouth (Béal an Bhulláin), Ship Point (Gob na Loinge) and Portaghurra Harbour (Port an Churaigh).

Dooniver has a number of beaches including Dooniver Strand and Bullsmouth Beach. Just off the village is the island of Innisbiggle.

== Census ==
The following list taken from the Mayo County Council website shows the population of the village in the years 1841-1921.

Year	Population	Houses
1841	252	50
1851	219	45
1861	254	52
1871	280	60
1881	234	45
1891	213	41
1901	270	48
1911	260	43
1921	242	58

== Facilities and amenities ==
Dooniver has a number of amenities, including a National School, hall, garage, plant hire, headstone maker and coffee shop. There is a bed and breakfast and caravan park. The village has one postbox, one bus stop and is served by Bus Éireann 440 once a day in each direction.

== Education ==
Dooniver has a National School (founded in 1910). The National School was originally in Bullsmouth, but was later moved. Students had a choice of going to either McHale College or Scoil Damhnait which is located in Pollranny in the Achill area but now go to the new Colaiste Pobail Acla.

== Sport ==
Dooniver Swifts played in the Mayo Association Football League during the 1950s. There is a GAA pitch in the area called St. Joseph's Park. Dooniver is a part of the St. Colman's (Dooniver, Askill, The Valley, Dugort and Dookinella) local GAA team and the 'DVDs' (Dooniver, The Valley, Dugort) soccer team. The professional boxer Johnny Kilbane has relatives in the village.

== See also ==
- List of towns and villages in Ireland

== Gallery ==
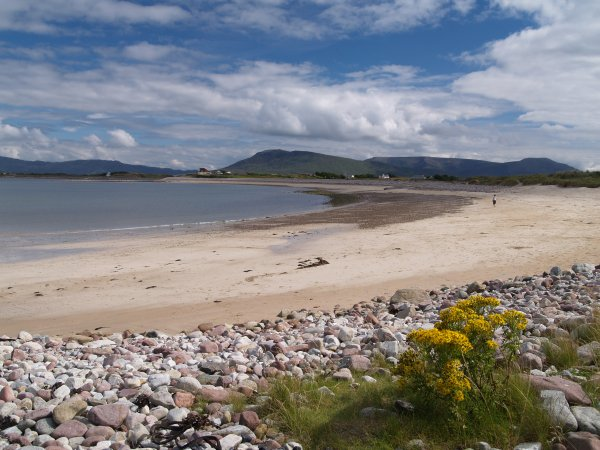
Sea view looking onto Inishbiggle

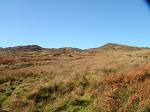
Dun Eibher

Dooniver sign

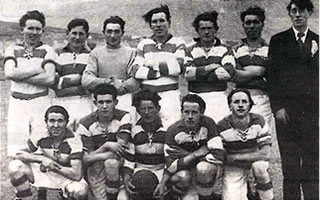
Dooniver Swifts in the 1950s
