= Sáile =

Sáile Salia
- Village
- Location in Ireland
- Coordinates: 53°56′49″N 9°56′22″W
- Country: Ireland
- Province: Connacht
- County: County Mayo
- Elevation: 1 m (3.3 ft)
- As this is a Gaeltacht village, the Irish Sáile is the only official name. The anglicized spellings have no official standing.

Sáile (anglicized as Salia or Saula) is a small Gaeltacht village on an easterly peninsula of Achill Island in County Mayo, Ireland. The village has a national school (founded in 1910). Villages neighbouring Sáile include Gob an Choire and An Caiseal.

== See also ==
- List of towns and villages in Ireland
