= Bun an Churraigh =

Bunacurry Bun an Churraigh
- Village
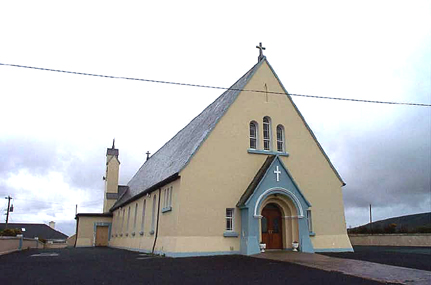
- St Joseph's Catholic Church, Bun an Churraigh

- Location in Ireland
- Coordinates: 53°58′22″N 9°59′02″W
- Country: Ireland
- Province: Connacht
- County: County Mayo
- Elevation: 1 m (3.3 ft)
- As this is a Gaeltacht village, the Irish Bun an Churraigh is the only official name. The anglicized spelling Bunacurry has no official standing.

Bun an Churraigh or Bun a' Churraigh (anglicized as Bunacurry) is a small Gaeltacht village in the north of Achill Island in County Mayo, Ireland. The village has a national school, a Roman Catholic church, and formerly had a monastery. It had two shops and a post office in the year 2000, but these shut in 2007. Today it is home to the Bunnacurry Business Park, which houses Achill Turbot and Western Woodcraft. The village also has a number of B & Bs.

It lies on the R319 regional road; and is served by the Bus Éireann 440 bus once a day in each direction. Villages neighbouring Bunacurry include Dooniver, Askill, Tóin an tSeanbhaile and Cashel.

== See also ==
- List of towns and villages in Ireland
