= Ballycroy, County Mayo =

Village in County Mayo, Ireland

Ballycroy Baile Chruaich
- Village
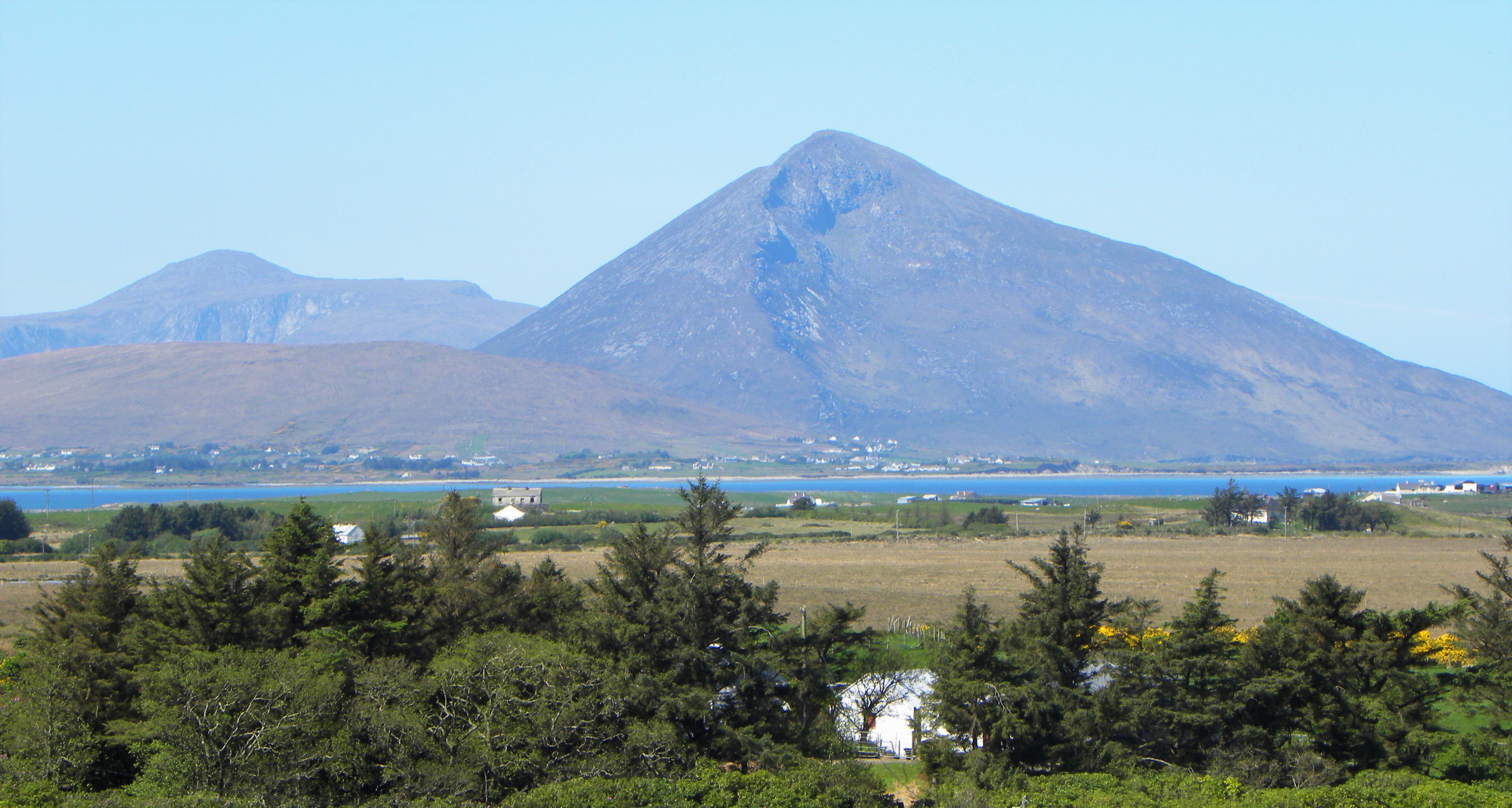
- View from Ballycroy towards Slievemore

- Location in Ireland
- Coordinates: 54°1′N 9°49′W
- Country: Ireland
- Province: Connacht
- County: County Mayo

Population (2022)
  - Total: 617
- Time zone: UTC+0 (WET)
  - Summer (DST): UTC-1 (IST (WEST))

Ballycroy (Irish: Baile Chruaich meaning "town of the stacks", either hay or turf) is a village in the civil parish of Kilcommon in County Mayo, Ireland. It was the location for the 1982 television film The Ballroom of Romance. The ballroom used in the film still exists, albeit in a derelict condition, and is located at Doona Cross, west of the village. Ballycroy is home to one of Ireland's National Parks, Wild Nephin (Ballycroy) National Park.

Ballycroy is also the name of two electoral divisions (ED) that form part of the local electoral area of Belmullet. As of 2022, Ballycroy North ED (containing 16 townlands) and Ballycroy South ED (containing 25 townlands) had a combined population of 617 people, scattered throughout numerous settlements.

== History ==
=== Early history ===
According to tradition, the first settlers in Ballycroy were from the Belgic Damnonii tribe, the Fir Domnann. Prehistoric settlement is recorded with structures including a portal tomb near Claggan Hill and a court cairn in the townland of Drumgallagh. Similarly, a medieval church dedicated to Enda of Aran once stood here, since demolished.

A similar historic fort is mentioned in Lettra as extant during the era of Táin Bó Fliadhas. Meanwhile, Fahy, a nearby townland, is home to a castle. The coast of Fahy experienced wrecks of Spanish ships as part of the Spanish Armada.

A bridle path that ran from Bangor Erris to Newport once passed through the area, it was used by Sir Richard Bingham to drive cattle from Erris.

In the 17th century the Cormack family owned Ballycroy. After supporting Jacobitism Cormack's descendants lost their land, which was then given to the Shaens.

=== 17th century settlement ===
In 1654, Catholics were expelled from Ulster to Mayo and several resettled in Ballycroy and the neighbouring Barony of Burrishoole.

Believed to have landed at Fahy, they were guided to Ballycroy by the O'Donnell family, several of these later converted to Anglicanism.

=== Later history ===
The people were described in the 19th century by Patrick Knight as continuing to maintain their Ulster dialect, intermarrying within their community.

Several hunting lodges were constructed, including one used as a station for the Black and Tans.

In the early 20th century, the Congested Districts Board and the Irish Land Commission purchased the land around Ballycroy and gradually distributed it to tenants, settling herders to lower lands.

The Irish Republican Army leader Jack McNeela was born in Ballycroy. After 55 days on hunger strike, he died in Dublin on 19 April 1940 at age 26.

== Geography ==
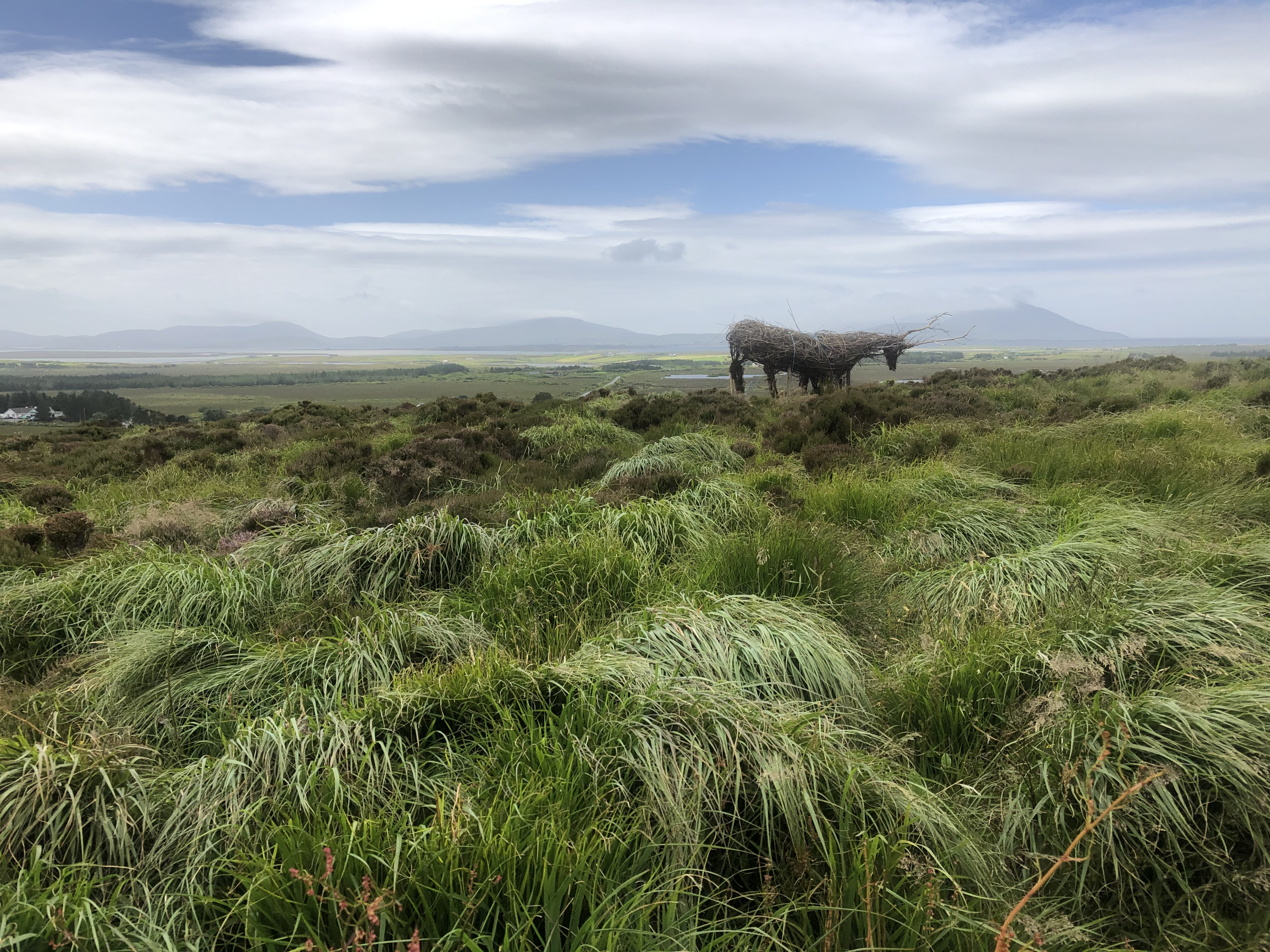
A sculpture in Wild Nephin National Park

The village is located on the N59 road. The two Ballcroy EDs cover approximately 51,943 acres, with a large portion consisting of mountain pasture. William Hamilton Maxwell in Wild Sports of the West (1832) described the terrain as characterised by bogs, morasses, expansive waters, and grazing lands. The local bedrock mainly consists of formations of quartz and mica-rich slate.

The Owenduff River and the Bellyveeny Rivers run through the townland.

== Religion ==
A Church of Ireland church dedicated to the Holy Trinity was constructed in the townland of Castlehill. Built in 1850 and consecrated in 1854, the church, designed by the Ecclesiastical Commissioners, is now in ruins. The church was closed in 1963 and fell into disrepair by 1991.

The local Catholic church was completed in 1853 and is dedicated to the Holy Family. The foundation stone for the church was laid in 1845 and was built in the shape of a cross. The old Catholic Church, a thatched building in the townland of Gortbrack, was destroyed during the Night of the Big Wind in 1839.

== Amenities ==
In the village of Ballycroy there is a school, Garda station, two pubs, a cemetery and the visitor centre for the Wild Nephin National Park. A community centre opened in 1984.

== Demographics ==
The historical population censuses shows that in 1831 the population was 2,925. By 1891 it had decreased to 2,036, representing an average annual decline of 0.60%. The downward trend continued, and by 1941 the population had further declined to 1,648, with an average annual decrease of 0.42%.

According to the 2006 census, there were 679 people in Ballycroy. At the time of the 2011 census, the population of the two electoral divisions (ED) compromising Ballycroy was 663, comprising 357 males and 306 females. The total housing stock was 342, of which vacant households numbered 104. With an approximate area of 210.2 km^{2}, Ballycroy had a 2011 population density of 3.15 people per km^{2}.

At the time of the 2016 census the population had declined to 636. By the 2022 census, the population of the area had further decreased to 617.

== See also ==
- List of towns and villages in Ireland
