= Nephin Beg =

Mountain in County Mayo, Ireland

- Néifinn Bheag
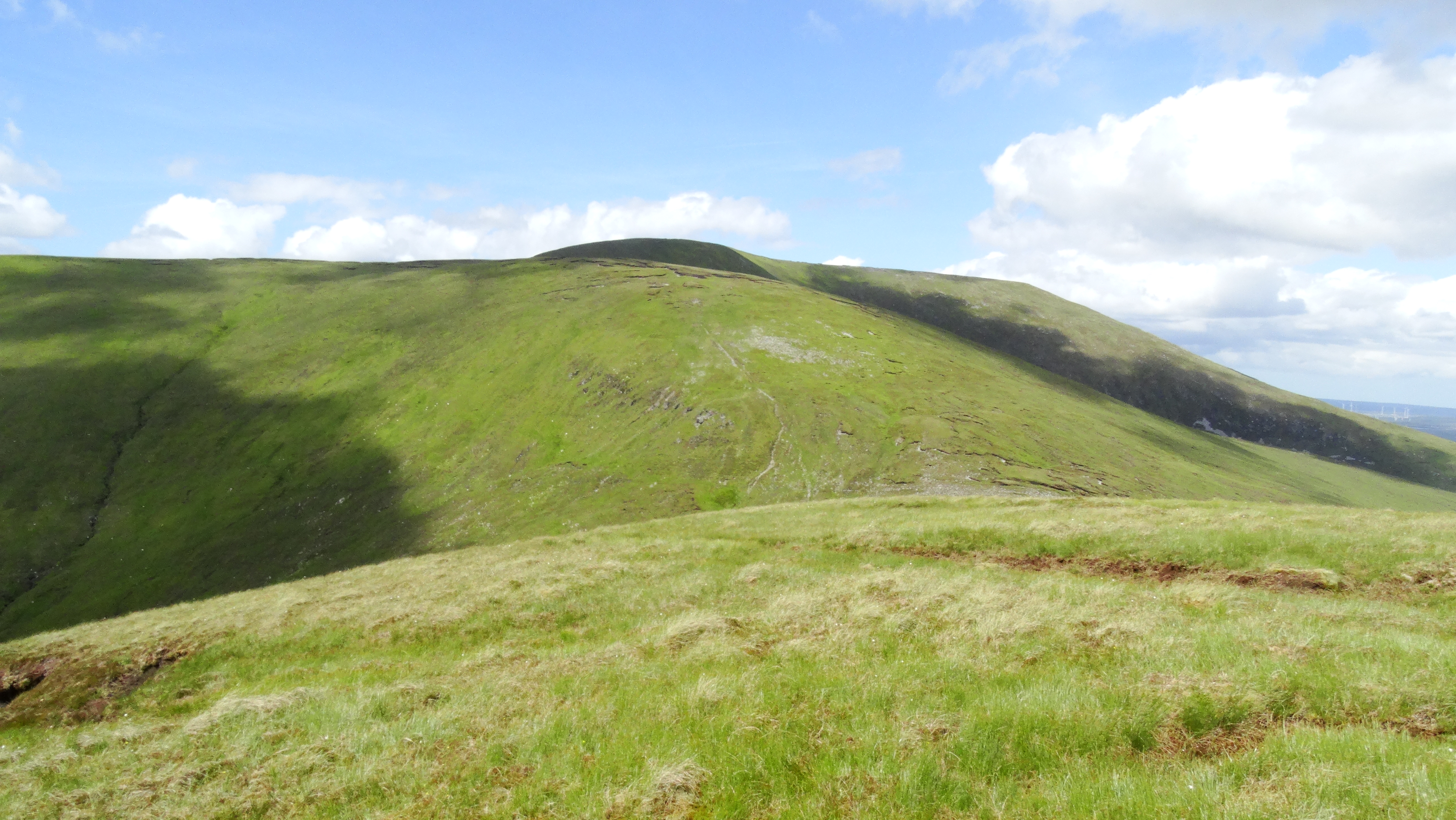
- Nephin Beg seen from its southern shoulder Cruckgarru

Highest point
- Elevation: 627 m (2,057 ft)
- Prominence: 365 m (1,198 ft)
- Coordinates: 54.0304°N 9.6618°W

Geography
- Location within island of Ireland
- Location: County Mayo, Ireland
- Parent range: Nephin Beg Range

Nephin Beg or Nefin Beg (Irish: Néifinn Bheag) is a mountain with a height of 627 metres (2,057 ft) in the Nephin Beg Range in County Mayo, Ireland. It is within Wild Nephin National Park. It seems to be named after the larger mountain Nephin (beag meaning 'little' or 'lesser'), although that mountain is some distance away and there are intervening mountains between them. Nephin Beg is also called Corr na gCapall, 'rounded/pointed mountain of the horse'.
