= Coláiste Pobail Acla =

School in County Mayo, Ireland

Coordinates: 53.9324°N 9.9141°W

Coláiste Pobail Alca
- Achill, County Mayo; Ireland

Information
- Motto: Mol an Óige (Praise the young)
- Established: 2011
- Educational authority: Mayo, Sligo and Leitrim Education and Training Board
- School number: 76150V
- Enrolment: 242 (2013)
- Website: www.colaistepobailacla.ie

Coláiste Pobail Acla is a secondary school located in Corraun Peninsula, Connacht, near Achill Island. The school was formed when Scoil Damhnait (founded by Padraig Sweeney in the 1940s), a secondary school on the Corraun Peninsula in the village of Pollranny, was amalgamated with McHale College in 2011, forming Coláiste Pobail Acla.
