= Achill Missionary Herald and Western Witness =

19th century Irish provincial newspaper

Achill Missionary Herald and Western Witness (1837–1869) was an Irish Provincial Newspaper.

Founded by Rev. Edward Nangle as a means of furthering his Protestant evangelical views and his Achill Mission Colony on Achill Island in the predominantly Roman Catholic province of Connaught, Ireland.

The first issue dated 31 July 1837 contained the statement that the paper would "bear a faithful and uncompromising testimony against the superstition and idolatry of the Church of Rome" and "proclaim the glorious truths of the Gospel." Together with the Achill Mission's annual reports, the Achill Missionary Herald provides and important insight, from an Achill Mission perspective, into its activities across several decades and particularly through the Great Famine years.

It was printed in Achill and was a constant source of irritation to the Roman Catholic hierarchy in Connaught. In October 1869, the publication was renamed The Achill Missionary Herald and Irish Church Advocate; in April 1875 it became The Irish Advocate and Missionary Herald and The Irish Church Advocate a year later.

There were conflicting views of Edward Nangle's legacy in the pages of The Church Advocate and the Irish Ecclesiastical Gazette following his death in 1883.
