= John Henry MacMahon =

Church of Ireland cleric and scholar (1829–1900)

John Henry MacMahon (1829 – 23 May 1900) was a Church of Ireland cleric, known as a scholar of patristics and the scholastic philosophers.

== Life ==
Born at Dublin in 1829, he was the son of John Macmahon, a barrister. He was educated at Enniskillen, and on 1 July 1846 entered Trinity College, Dublin, as a pensioner; he graduated B.A. in 1852, being senior moderator and gold medallist in ethics and logic, and proceeded M.A. in 1856.

MacMahon took holy orders in 1853, and was for some years a curate under William Alexander, later Archbishop of Armagh. He left parochial work after the disestablishment of the Church of Ireland church in 1869. He was subsequently chaplain to the lord-lieutenant, and from 1890 to Mountjoy Prison. He died in Dublin on 23 May 1900. His daughter was the romance novelist Eleanor MacMahon.

== Works ==
MacMahon was deeply read in Aristotle, the Christian fathers, and the schoolmen, but was not considered an original thinker. His works were:

- Metaphysics of Aristotle, literally translated from the Greek (1857), in Bohn's Classical Library
- A Treatise on Metaphysics, chiefly in reference to Revealed Religion (1860)
- Church and State in England: its [sic] Origin and Use (1873), arguing for the maintenance of the established church
- The Refutation of all Heresies by Hippolytus, translated (1888) in the Ante-Nicene Library

== Notes ==
Attribution

This article incorporates text from a publication now in the public domain: Lee, Sidney, ed. (1901). "MacMahon, John Henry". Dictionary of National Biography (1st supplement). Vol. 3. London: Smith, Elder & Co.
