= Souperism =

Mythologized phenomenon of the Irish Great Famine

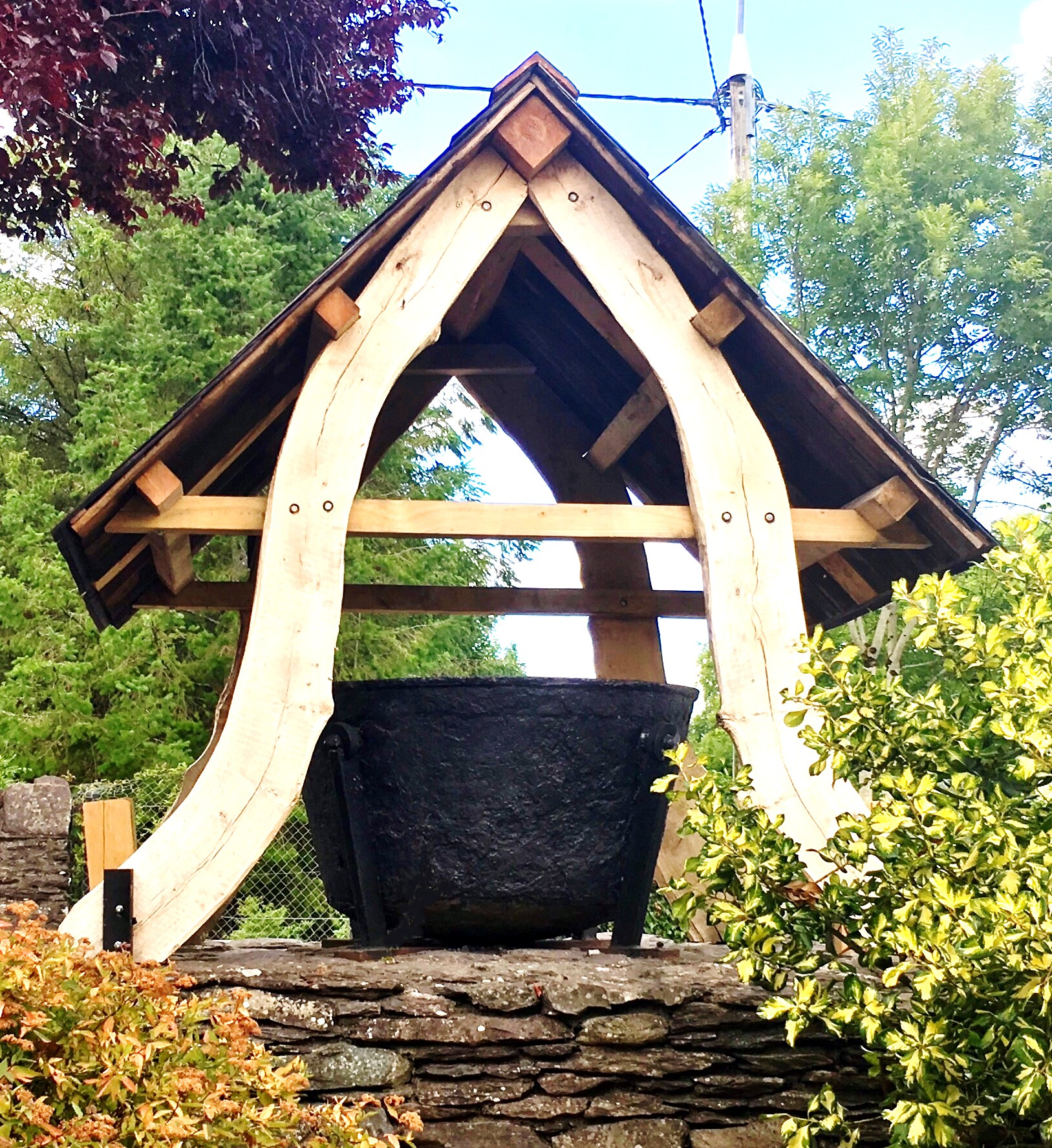
Famine memorial in Ballingeary, County Cork

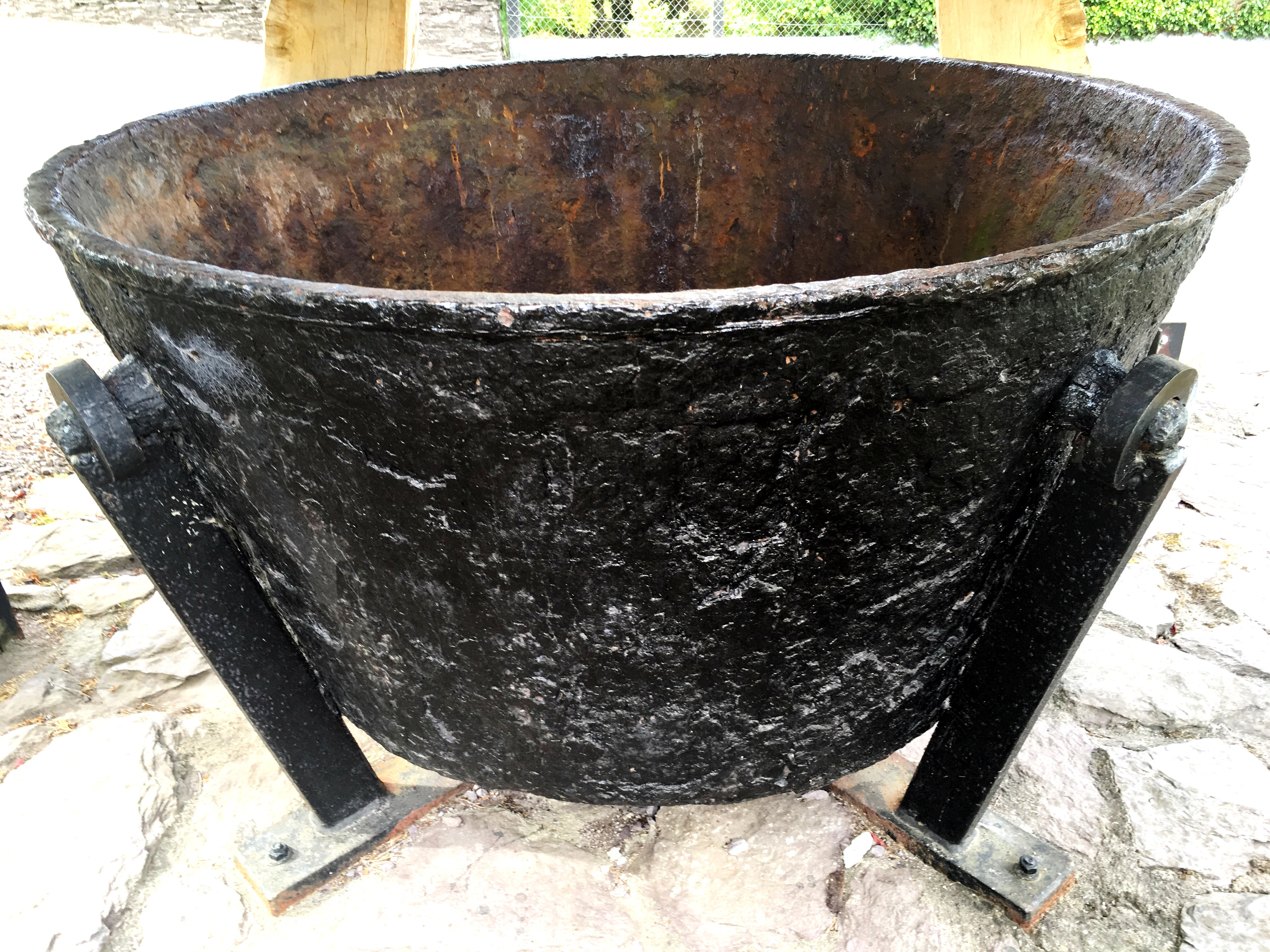
Ballingeary famine soup-pot

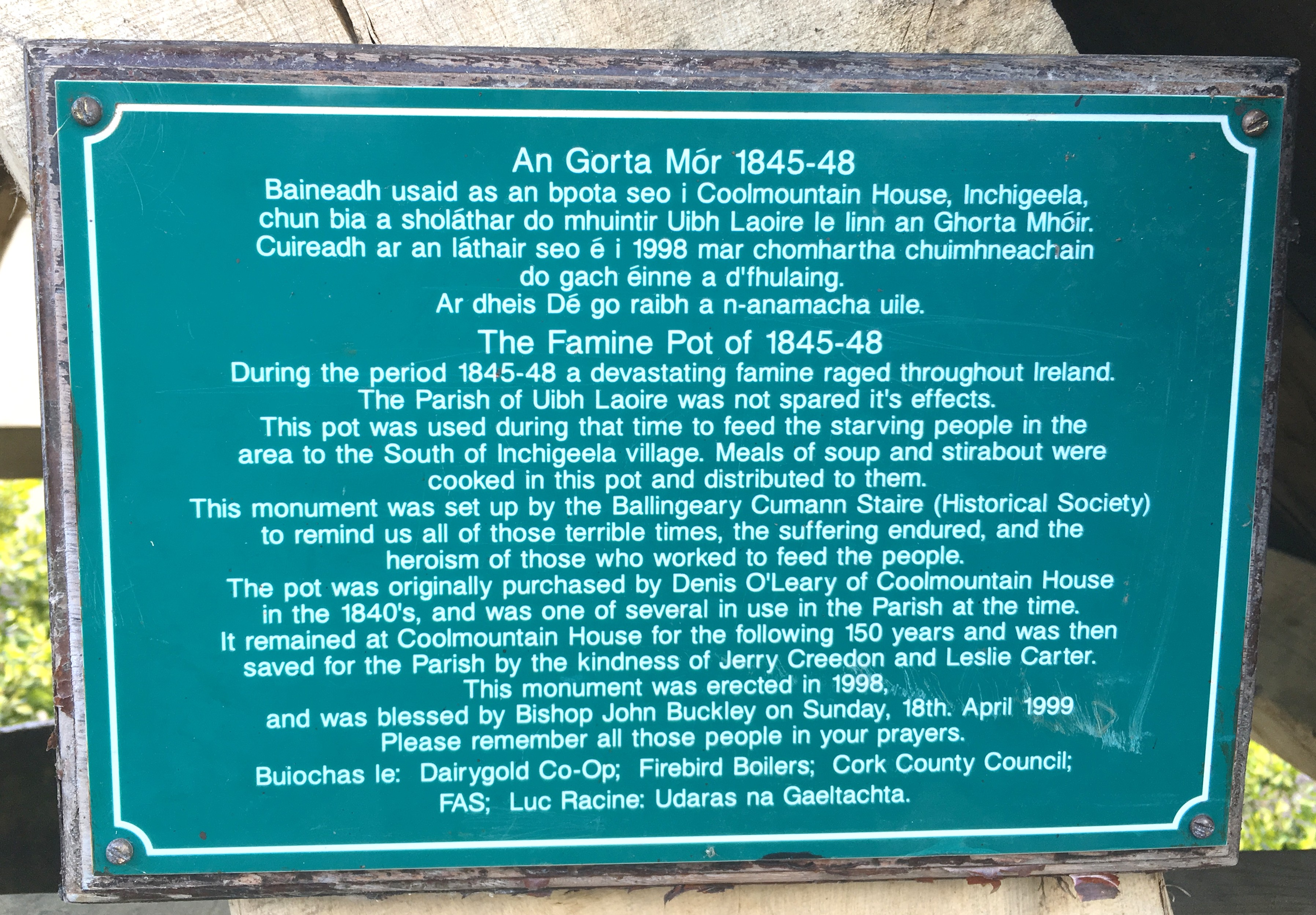
Ballingeary famine plaque

Souperism was a phenomenon of the Irish Great Famine. Protestant Bible societies set up schools in which starving children were fed, on the condition of receiving Protestant religious instruction at the same time. Its practitioners were reviled by the Catholic families who had to choose between Protestantism and starvation. People who converted for food were known as "soupers", "jumpers" and "cat breacs". In the words of their peers, they "took the soup". Although souperism did not occur frequently, the perception of it had a lasting effect on the popular memory of the Famine. It blemished the relief work by Protestants who gave aid without proselytising, and the rumour of souperism may have discouraged starving Catholics from attending soup kitchens for fear of betraying their faith.

== History ==
One example of souperism was the Reverend Edward Nangle who established the Achill Mission Colony in the 1830s. In the Famine years, he took the decision to provide food for the children in the Colony's scriptural schools which led to a rise in demand for places in those schools. This, in turn, led to charges that Edward Nangle was a 'buyer of souls'. However, souperism was rarely that simple, and not all non-Catholics made being subject to proselytisation a condition of food aid. Several Anglicans, including the Anglican Archbishop of Dublin, Richard Whately, decried the practice; many Anglicans set up soup kitchens that did no proselytising; and Quakers, whose soup kitchens were concerned solely with charitable work, were never associated with the practice (which causes them to be held in high regard in Ireland even today, with many Irish remembering the Quakers with the remark "They fed us in the famine.").

Souperist practices, reported at the time, included serving meat soups on Fridays – which Catholics were forbidden by their faith from consuming.

Soupers were frequently ostracised by their own community, and were strongly denounced from the pulpit by the Catholic priesthood. On occasion, soupers had to be protected by British soldiers from other Catholics.

== Use of the term after the famine ==
The idea of Souperism has become a leitmotif of fiction written about the Famine, and folklore and Irish literature are replete with depictions of souperism. This may have served to exaggerate the extent that it actually occurred. Both Bowen and Whelan (listed in Further reading) note that the fear of souperism was very real, and state that the practice did indeed occur. But they point out that there is very little actual evidence that the practice was widespread. Whelan states that, given the highly charged atmosphere of the 1840s, contemporary accounts cannot be taken at face value. Much of what surrounds the story of souperism is its perception, rather than its reality. The popular myth that the few souperists engendered has largely eclipsed the impartial philanthropic aid that was given by genuinely altruistic organisations at the time.

One of the effects of the perceptions surrounding Souperism was that, to avoid its stigma and avoid becoming embroiled in the war of words between Protestants and Catholics, many charities decided to only serve those whose religious persuasions matched their own. For examples: In Dublin, Mercer's Endowed Boarding School for Girls provided education for "girls of respectable Protestant parents", and the Magdalene Asylum on Lower Leeson St aided "Protestant women after a first fall" and "those who were to become mothers"; whereas the St Joseph's Reformatory School for Catholic Girls provided education for Catholic girls and the Catholic Rotunda Girls Aid Society aided unmarried Catholic mothers. Barret, whose Guide to Dublin Charities listed many overlapping charities, decried the "wasteful overlapping of work" and begged such charities to work together, to improve the overall amount of aid that could be given. (Williams, publisher of Dublin Charities: A Handbook, expressed similar sentiments about the state of disorganisation.) However, she herself ran a charity, Cottage Home for Little Children, aimed at providing shelter for "the very young children of the industrious Protestant poor". The reasons for the disorganised and duplicated efforts were not solely sectarian, and can also be attributed to a general unwillingness amongst charities to co-operate with one another.

By 1913 "souper" had become a general term of abuse used against overly religious Catholics as well. A priest near Macroom was opposed to informal dances, and a crowd of dancers taunted his informants with shouts of "soupers".

== See also ==
- Protestant Ascendancy
- Rice Christian
