= An Caiseal =

An Caiseal Cashel
- Village
- Location in Ireland
- Coordinates: 53°57′24″N 9°58′11″W
- Country: Ireland
- Province: Connacht
- County: County Mayo
- Elevation: 2 m (6.6 ft)
- As this is a Gaeltacht village, the Irish An Caiseal is the only official name. The anglicized spelling Cashel has no official standing.

An Caiseal (anglicized as Cashel) is a small Gaeltacht village on the east side of Achill Island in County Mayo, Ireland. Villages neighboring Cashel include Gob an Choire, Bun an Churraigh and Sáile.

The village has one shop, one postbox, two pubs, and a number of other businesses. It is served by the Bus Éireann 440 once a day in each direction.
