= Slievemore =

Mountain off west coast of Ireland

Coordinates: 54.00905°N 10.05994°W

- Slievemore, as seen from Dugort Beach

Highest point
- Elevation: 671 m (2,201 ft)
- Prominence: 582 m (1,909 ft)
- Parent peak: Croaghaun
- Listing: Marilyn, Hewitt

Naming
- Native name: Sliabh Mór (Irish)
- English translation: 'big mountain'
- Pronunciation: Irish: [ˈʃl̠ʲiəw mˠoːɾˠ]

Geography
- Location within island of Ireland
- Location: County Mayo, Ireland
- Parent range: Achill Island
- OSI/OSNI grid: F650086
- Topo map: OSi Discovery 30

Slievemore (Irish: Sliabh Mór, meaning 'big mountain') is the second highest peak on Achill Island after Croaghaun, in County Mayo, Ireland. Its elevation is 671 m (2,201 ft).

== Archaeology ==
In 1991, the Achill Archaeological Field School was opened. That year, the Deserted Village Project was created to perform archaeology excavations in Slievemore.

== See also ==
- Lists of mountains in Ireland
