= Wild Nephin National Park =

National park in western Ireland

Coordinates: 54.017°N 9.700°W

- Páirc Náisiúnta Néifinne Fiáine
- IUCN category II (national park)
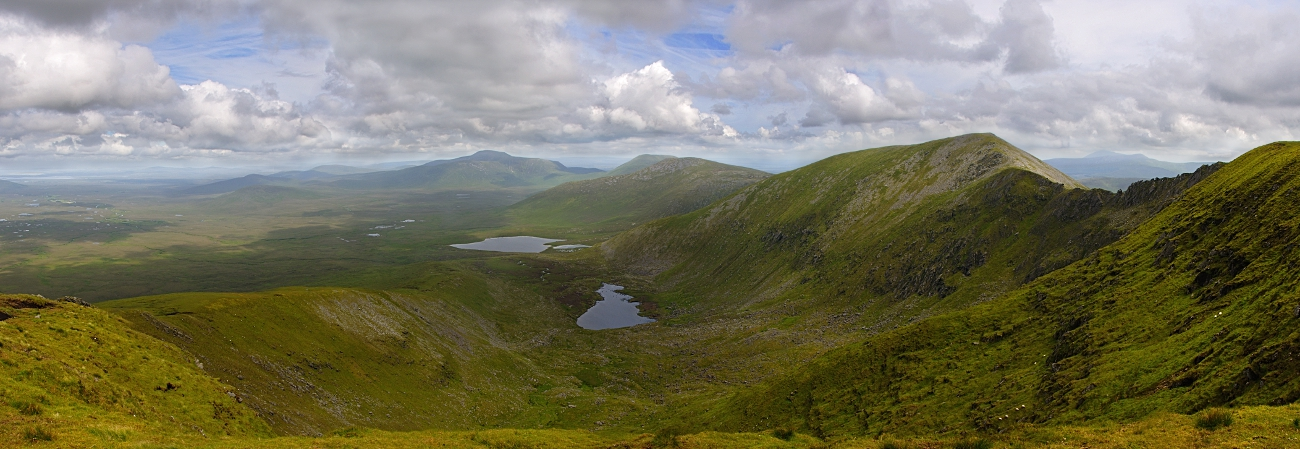
- View of the park from the southwest
- Interactive map of Wild Nephin National Park
- Location: County Mayo, Ireland
- Area: 150 km^{2} (58 sq mi)
- Established: 1998
- Governing body: National Parks and Wildlife Service

National Parks in Ireland

Wild Nephin (Irish: Néifinn Fhiáin, NAY-FINN) is a national park in northwest County Mayo, Ireland. It includes much of the Nephin Beg Mountains and one of the largest expanses of peatland in Europe, consisting of 150 square kilometres of Atlantic blanket bog. It is a unique habitat with a diverse flora and fauna. It was established as Ballycroy National Park in 1998, then expanded and re-named in 2018, with plans to re-wild the additional lands acquired at Nephin Forest to the east of the Nephin Beg Mountains. Wild Nephin includes the most remote point of land on the Irish mainland. The park is a candidate Special Area of Conservation (cSAC) as part of a site known as the Owenduff/Nephin Complex. It is also a Special Protection Area and part of the Natura 2000 network.

== History ==
The European Union Habitats Directive (92/43/EEC), which was transposed into Irish law in 1997, lists certain habitats and species that the Irish Government was required to designate as SACs to ensure their protection. These habitats include blanket bogs. The bog at Ballycroy is especially important in this regard because it is one of the largest examples of a blanket bog habitat left in Western Europe. Ballycroy was established as a national park on 1 November 1998. It is managed under the State Property Act of 1954.

In 2017, 4,000 hectares of conifer forest and mountain controlled by Coillte was added to the 11,000 hectares of the adjoining Ballycroy National Park. The area is to be managed by the National Parks and Wildlife Service (NPWS) and has been identified as having potential for rewilding. The area was originally an industrial forest, consisting of lodgepole pine and spruce plantations, with forestry roads throughout.

== Features ==
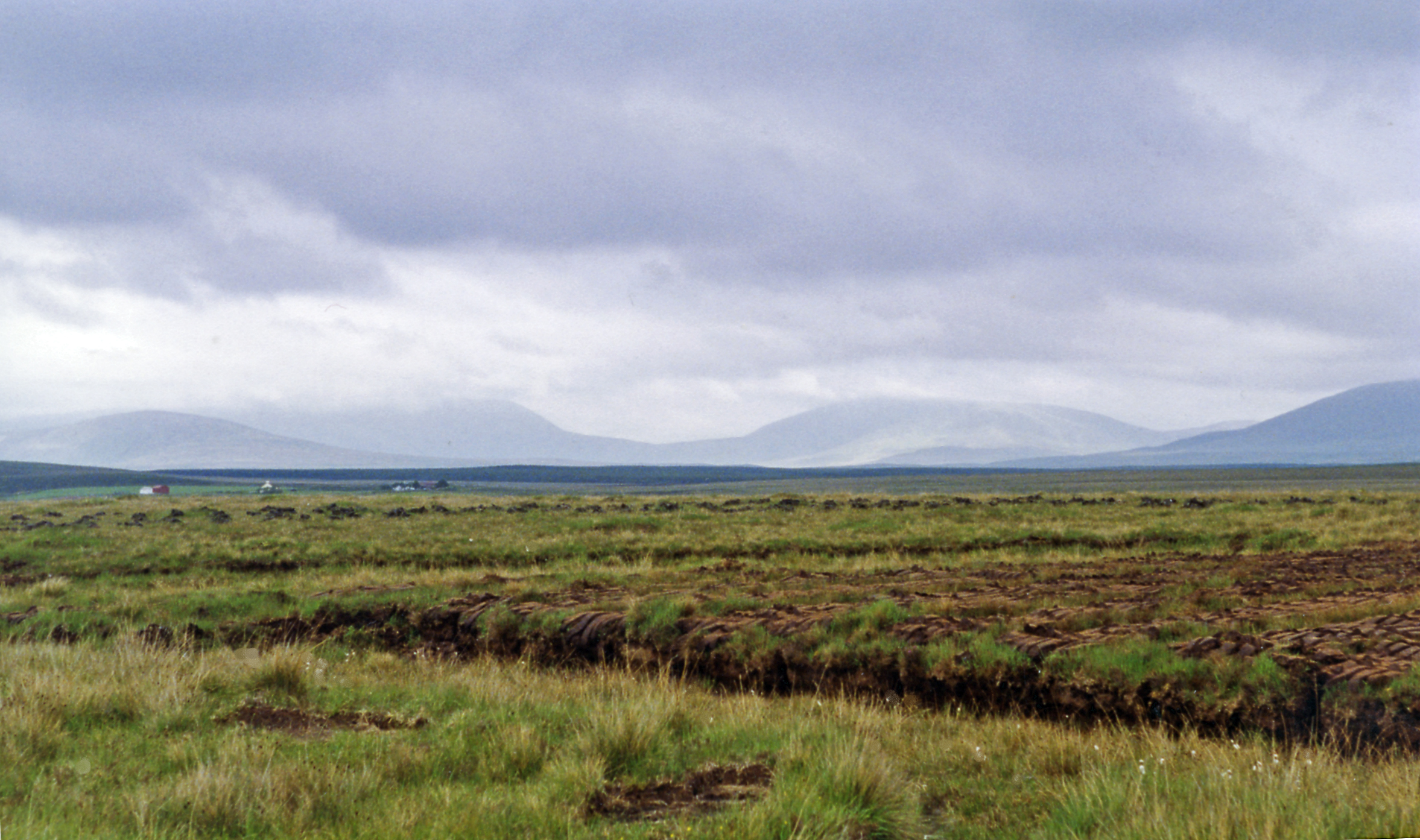
Wild Nephin from the west

Blanket bogs, cliffs and river habitats are found in the park. The blanket bog is one of the largest expanses of peatland left in Europe. Conservation of the bog is thus of international importance because of the niches it provides for various species, such as rare species of plants such as Hamatocaulis vernicosus. The Owenduff River is also an important conservation area because it is the only river in Western Europe that still drains a relatively intact and extensive blanket bog system. It is also an important salmon and sea trout river.

The Owenduff area is an important roosting, feeding and breeding site for a number of migratory bird species, such as the Greenland white-fronted goose, that are protected by the European Union Birds Directive. Other rare species found in the park include the whooper swan, and the peregrine falcon.

Wild Nephin National Park is also the Mayo Dark Sky Park, which is Ireland's first International Dark Sky Park. The park received a Gold Tier standard certification in May 2016, which is modeled on conservation programmes for other World Heritage Sites and Biosphere Reserves. A Gold Tier award is the highest possible accolade, meaning that Mayo is now internationally recognised as one of the best places in the world to view the wonders of the night.

A visitor centre for the national park opened in 2009. The 700 square meter building overlooks the Atlantic Ocean in Ballycroy village. Apart from certain holidays, it is open "year round".
