= Soldier's Song (disambiguation) =

"The Soldier's Song" (Irish: "Amhrán na bhFiann") is the Irish national anthem.

Soldier's Song may also refer to:

- The Soldier's Song (novel), first in the Soldier's Song trilogy by Alan Monaghan, published in 2010
- "A Soldier's Song", a poem by C. Flavell Hayward and set to music by Elgar as "A War Song" in 1884
- "Soldier's Song" (Hungarian: "Katonadal"), a Hungarian-language choral work by Zoltán Kodály (1882–1967)

== See also ==
- Songs title "Soldier" or "Soldiers"; see Soldier (disambiguation) § Songs
- War song (disambiguation)
