= War song (disambiguation) =

A war song is a musical composition that relates to war.

War song may also refer to:

- "War Song", a 1972 song by Neil Young
- "The War Song", 1984 song by Culture Club
- "A War Song", a poem by C. Flavell Hayward, set to music by Edward Elgar in 1884
- Warsong, a 1991 video game
- "The War Song”, a 1986 song by Tatsuro Yamashita from the album Pocket Music

== See also ==
- War (disambiguation), for songs with the title "War"
- Anti-war song
- War Story (disambiguation)
