= War Story =

A War Story or War Stories or variation, may refer to:

== Film ==
- A War Story, a 1981 docudrama about Major Ben Wheeler in World War II
- War Story (1989 film), a 1989 animated short film by Aardman Animations
- War Stories (2003 film), a TV movie with Jeff Goldblum
- War Story (2014 film), a 2014 film featuring Catherine Keener and Ben Kingsley

== Television ==
- War Story (TV series), a Canadian documentary television series which premiered in 2012
- War Stories with Oliver North (TV series), a military history program on the U.S. Fox News Channel
- "War Stories" (Firefly), the tenth episode of science-fiction television series Firefly

== Music ==
- War Stories (album), a 2007 electronic album by UNKLE
- A War Story Book I, a 1999 album by Psycho Realm
- A War Story Book II, a 2003 album by Psycho Realm
- War Story, a 2024 album by Yelawolf

== Comics ==
- War Story (comics), a comic written by Garth Ennis
- War Stories (comics), comic book series from 2001
- Nambul: War Stories, a manhwa series of the military drama genre written by Hyun Se Lee
- The A-Team: War Stories, 2010 comic book miniseries

== See also ==
- War (disambiguation), for stories named "War"
- War song (disambiguation)
- History of war
- War novel, genre of fiction
- War comic, genre of comics
- War film, genre of film
