= Follow the Colours =

1907 marching song written by Edward Elgar

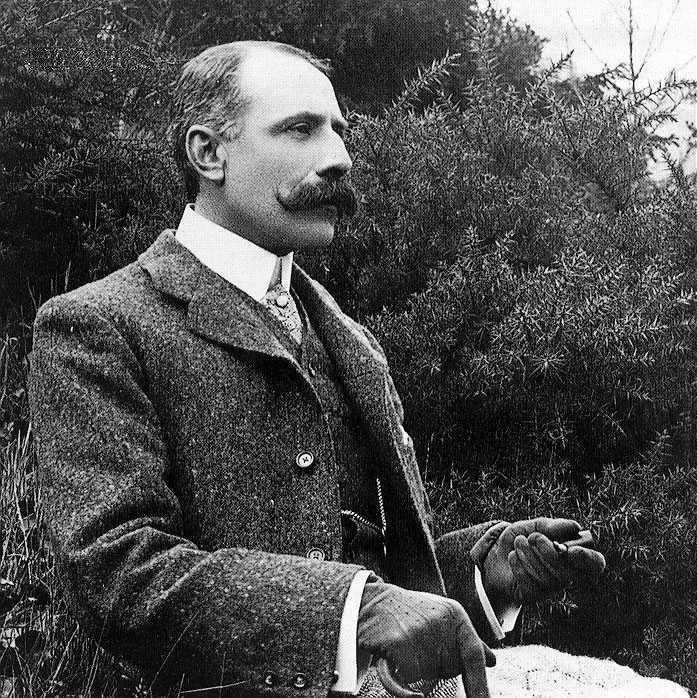
Edward Elgar, c. 1900

"Follow the Colours" is a marching song written by the English composer Edward Elgar in 1907, with words by Capt. William de Courcy Stretton. The song is for male voice solo with an optional male voice chorus, accompanied by piano, orchestra or military band.

== History ==
In January 1907 William Henry Ash, grandson of pioneer dental manufacturer Claudius Ash, as a Liveryman of the Worshipful Company of Musicians offered a prize of 20 guineas for the words of "a marching song for British soldiers". The popular writers Kipling and Conan Doyle having refused, the offer was advertised in the newspapers. In November the company announced that the winner (of 96 applicants) was William de Courcy Stretton - a 45 year old retired Royal Artillery captain from Salcombe in Devon - and that the music was to be written by Elgar. Alfred Littleton, chairman of publishers Novello and also a Liveryman of the company, had to plead with Elgar to go ahead, as there was much Elgar disliked about the idea. Elgar eventually wrote an orchestral score to include the four verses, and this was posted to Novello's on 27 December.

At Elgar's request, his score was arranged for military band by Capt. Arthur J. Stretton, Director of Music at the Royal Military School of Music (Kneller Hall), and first performed by a Kneller Hall band and chorus, conducted by Capt. Stretton, at the annual banquet of the Musicians Company at Stationers Hall on 28 April 1908, when it was for that occasion given the generic title "Marching Song". Then, with much publicity, and with the title "Follow the Colours" taken from the refrain, it was given its first public performance at the Empire Day concert in the Royal Albert Hall on 24 May 1908, with the London Symphony Orchestra, and the tenors and basses of the Royal Choral Society, conducted by Sir Alexander Mackenzie. A few days later, on 27 May, it was performed at the first Kneller Hall evening concert of the season when the band was conducted by student bandmaster H. Norris. The work was soon published by Novellos and performed at many locations in the UK for the remainder of that year and until 1915.

The full orchestral score was presented by Elgar to the Worshipful Company of Musicians on 14 June 1910.

Its first wartime performance was at the Royal Albert Hall, London, on 10 October 1914, following much publicity. It was at a concert in aid of the Queen's "Work for Women" Fund, and supported by singers Dame Clara Butt and Kennerley Rumford, with the Queen's Hall Orchestra and singers of the Royal Choral Society. It was the first concert in a series to be performed at 22 locations throughout the UK.

Such was its pre-war success that in 1914 it was republished by Novellos in a version (in key D) with piano accompaniment, with fewer introductory bars and the third verse omitted. There were few performances after 1915.

Tragically the author, William de Courcy Stretton, lost four of his five sons, Capt Alexander Lynam (M.C.), Capt William Stapelton, Able Seaman Conrad (Royal Australian Navy) and 2nd Lt John while fighting for the British Empire during the First World War.

== Music ==
The impression is of cheerful optimism, a fine cheerful tune and chorus cleverly livened by cross-rhythms: but we must remember that it was written before the real horrors which Elgar later recalled more sensitively with For the Fallen. The coming of the war had made its sentiments inappropriate.

The chorus generally reinforces the solo singer in the second and fourth lines of each verse, and joins in the refrain.

The accompaniment is for full orchestra, and is an example of brilliant but sensitive writing for the large percussion section, which consists of three timpani, side drum, triangle, bass drum and cymbals.

== Lyrics ==
FOLLOW THE COLOURS

1.

Thousands, thousands of marching feet,

All through the land, all through the land;

Gunners and Sappers, Horse and Foot,

A mighty band, a mighty band.

Refrain, after each verse:

Follow the Colours, follow on,

Where’er they go, where’er they go;

Loyal the hearts that guard them well,

’Twas ever so, ’twas ever so.

March, march, march !

Roll the drums, and blow the fifes,

And make the bagpipes drone;

Glory for some and a chance for all,

Till we come again to our own.

2.

England, Scotland, Ireland and Wales

Send forth their sons, send forth their sons;

Children of Empire seas beyond

Stand to their guns, stand to their guns.

3.

What's in the wind now, what's toward ?

Who cares a bit, who cares a bit ?

Marching orders, we're on the way

To settle it, to settle it.

4.

Some will return, and some remain,

We heed it not, we heed it not;

Something’s wrong, to put it right ’s

The Soldier’s lot, the Soldier’s lot.

William de Courcy Stretton

== Recordings ==
- "The Unknown Elgar" includes "Follow the Colours" performed by Stephen Holloway (bass), with Barry Collett (piano), and male voice chorus.
- John Ireland - Orchestral Songs and Miniatures With a collection of the music of Ireland, two songs by Elgar are included: Follow the Colours and A War Song, performed by Roderick Williams (baritone), BBC Concert Orchestra/Martin Yates
