= Alan Monaghan =

- Born: 5 June 1970 (age 56); Dublin, Ireland
- Occupation: novelist
- Writing career
- Notable work: The Soldier's Song

Alan Monaghan (born May 6, 1970) is an Irish novelist. He has been shortlisted for the Irish Book Awards and has won the 2002 Hennessy New Irish Writer Award.

== Life and works ==
Monaghan was born in Dublin where he served his apprenticeship as a boilermaker in the Guinness brewery before becoming an engineer. He began his literary career in 1995 with the short story Rosary which was shortlisted for the Hennessy X.O Literary Awards. This nomination was successfully followed in 2002 when Monaghan won the Hennessy New Irish Writer Award and the Award for Emerging Fiction for his short story The Soldier's Song. Monaghan has developed this short story into a series of books the first of which, The Soldier's Song was published in 2010.

Monaghan has been highly praised for his writing style and was nominated in the Best Newcomer category of the 2010 Irish Book Awards.

== Personal life ==
Monaghan continues to live in Dublin with his family.

== Bibliography ==
Fiction

- Rosary (1995)
- The Soldier's Song (2002)
- The Soldier's Song (2010)
