= The Soldier's Song (novel) =

Novel by Alan Monaghan

- First edition cover
- Author: Alan Monaghan
- Language: English
- Genre: War novel
- Publisher: Macmillan
- Publication date: 1 Jan 2010
- Publication place: Ireland
- Media type: Print (Paperback & E-book)
- Pages: 297 pp (first edition)
- ISBN: 978-0-230-74086-0 (first edition)
- Followed by: The Soldier's Return

The Soldier's Song is the debut novel from Alan Monaghan and the first in the Soldier's Song Trilogy.

Set during World War I, the novel follows the fortunes of Stephen Ryan, a gifted young maths scholar, as he enlists in the British army and leaves his native Ireland to fight in Europe. He finds his loyalties tested, however, when he returns from the front in 1916 to find Ireland in the midst of an uprising. The harsh realities of war combined with the strain of having to reflect on his own identity and allegiances take their toll as Stephen is pushed ever closer to his breaking point.

== Reception ==
The novel was positively received upon its release and gained, for its author, a nomination at the 2010 Irish Book Awards for best newcomer. It has also been longlisted for the 2010/2011 Waverton Good Read Award.
