= A War Song =

19th-century poem

"A War Song", originally called "A Soldier's Song", was a poem written by C. Flavell Hayward and set to music by the English composer Edward Elgar in 1884.

As A Soldier's Song, it was Elgar's first published song, appearing in Magazine of Music in 1890. It was dedicated to "F. G. P." (Frederick Pedley), who gave its first performance on 18 March 1884 at a Worcester Glee Club meeting in the Crown Hotel, Broad Street, Worcester.

In 1903 it was re-published by Boosey & Co. with the name A War Song, as Elgar's Op. 5. The cover of the song clearly shows "Op.5, No.1", but no other Op.5 work is known, though J.F. Porte in his book describing the works of Elgar commends 'the two numbers comprising Opus 5.' It was performed at the Royal Albert Hall on 1 October of that year, sung by Kennerley Rumford.

== Lyrics ==
A SOLDIER'S SONG / A WAR SONG

Hear the whiz of the shot as it flies,
Hear the rush of the shell in the skies,
Hear the bayonet’s clash, ringing bright,
See the flash of the steel as they fight,
Hear the conqueror’s shout !
As the foe’s put to rout !
Hear the cry of despair
That is rending the air –
Now the neigh of a horse, now the bugle’s loud blast.
See! anger and pain, passion and shame,
A struggle for life, a thirst for fame.

Ah !

Glory or death, for true hearts and brave,
Honour in life, or rest in a grave.

Now the warfare is o’er, life is past,
Now in peace lie the dead, still at last ;
Bronzed and brown, wan and pale, side by side,
Side by side, as they fought, fell and died ;
There they lie, rank and pride,
Rags and wealth, proved and tried.
Youth and age, fear and trust,
Scarred and scorched, in the dust ;
Gone for ever their pain, anger, passion, and shame,
Gone! tumult and smoke, conflict and din,
Gone, anguish and trouble, sorrow and sin, -

Ah !

Glory or death, for true hearts and brave,
Honour in life, or rest in a grave.

== Recordings ==
- "The Unknown Elgar" includes "A War Song" performed by Stephen Holloway (bass), with Barry Collett (piano)
- Songs and Piano Music by Edward Elgar has "A War Song" performed by Peter Savidge (baritone), with David Owen Norris (piano).
- John Ireland - Orchestral Songs and Miniatures With a collection of the music of Ireland, two songs by Elgar are included: Follow the Colours and A War Song, performed by Roderick Williams (baritone), BBC Concert Orchestra/Martin Yates
