= Kingdom of Leinster =

Former Gaelic kingdom in Ireland

Kingdom of Leinster Laighin
- 7th century BC–1603
- The Mac Murchadha Caomhánach as leaders of the Laigin provided many kings of Leinster.

- A map of Leinster in the 10th century, with boundaries accounting for the loss of Osraige.
- Capital: Ferns; Naas, Mullaghmast & Lyons (rotational); Dún Ailinne (ancient)
- Common languages: Primitive Irish, Old Irish, Middle Irish, Latin
- Religion: Gaelic Christianity; Catholic Christianity; Gaelic tradition
- Government: Tanistry
- Rí
  - 634–594 BC: Úgaine Mór
  - 1603: Domhnall Spáinneach Mac Murchadha Caomhánach
- History
  - Established: 7th century BC
  - Disestablished: 1603
Succeeded by
Kingdom of Meath
Kingdom of Munster
Lordship of Ireland
Kingdom of Ireland
- Today part of: Ireland

The Kingdom of Leinster (Irish: Ríocht Laighean) was a kingdom of Gaelic Ireland which existed in the east of the island from the Irish Iron Age until the 17th century Early Modern Ireland. According to traditional Irish history found in the Annals of the Four Masters, the kingdom was founded as the territory of the Laighin, a Heremonian tribe of Irish Gaels. Some of the early kings of Leinster were also High Kings of Ireland and Kings of Tara, such as Úgaine Mór, Labraid Loingsech and Cathair Mór.

The Leinstermen had originally achieved hegemony in Ireland to the detriment of the Ulster-based Érainn, another group of Irish Gaels, but eventually lost out to their kinsmen the Connachta. This fall from power had lasting consequences in terms of territory for Leinster, as the Southern Uí Néill carved out the Kingdom of Meath to the north, and control of Osraige to the west was lost to the Corcu Loígde, becoming part of the Kingdom of Munster. The kingdom had different borders and internal divisions at different times during its history.

During the 5th to the early 8th centuries, the Kingship of Leinster was contested by various different branches of the Laighín, including the Uí Cheinnselaig (ancestors of the Mac Murchada and Ó Tuathail), the Uí Bairrche (ancestors of the Mac Gormáin), the Uí Máil (ancestors of the Ó Conchobhair Uí Failghe) and others. Following this period, until the 11th century, Leinster was mostly contested between two branches of the Uí Dúnlainge kinship, represented by what are today the families of Ó Tuathail and Ó Brion. In the 9th century, the Laighín also regained control of Osraige but it remained a largely independent realm under the Mac Giolla Phádrag.

Leinster had to contend with raids from the Vikings under the Uí Ímair from the 9th century onwards, who established themselves at Dublin and Wexford. As part of these Gaelic-Viking battles, Murchad mac Diarmata, King of Leinster took control of the Kingdom of Dublin and the Kingdom of Mann and the Isles (what is now the Isle of Man and the Scottish Hebrides) for a brief period. His father, Diarmait mac Máel na mBó, was the first Leinster High King of Ireland in centuries. This reversal in fortunes was brief, however, with the 12th century Norman invasion of Ireland seeing Leinster closely caught up in the affairs with Diarmait mac Murchada. In the longterm Leinster lost territories to the Normans, which became the Pale as the administrative centre of the Kingdom of England's Lordship of Ireland, as well as the Earldom of Kildare to the FitzGerald dynasty. This did not mean the end of Leinster, however and the kingdom continued to control much of what is today County Wexford and County Carlow and parts of County Wicklow until the early 17th century when it became part of the Tudor Kingdom of Ireland, later being revived as the Province of Leinster.

== Etymology ==
The name of the Kingdom of Leinster is derived directly from the tribal name Laigin, a group of Irish Gaels who all claim descent in the male paternal line from Érimón. Other branches of the Heremonians include the Érainn, Connachta, Uí Néill, Clan Colla, Uí Maine and the Dalcassians (though they invented genealogies to deny this). Labhraidh Loingseach is sometimes cited as the progenitor of the Laigin but his direct paternal ancestors had been High Kings of Ireland and Kings of Tara for some time before he emerged on the scene. A late medieval text in Middle Irish named Cóir Anmann (known in English as the "Fitness of Names" or the "Elucidation of Names") gives an etymology for the term Leinster. It claims that the name derives from the word laigin ("spears"), in reference to the large spears carried by "2,200" Gaulish mercenaries which Labhraidh Loingseach brought back from the Continent with him and hosted at Cobthach Cóel Breg's house at Dind Ríg. His descendants were subsequently known as the Laigin ("Leinstermen").

== History ==
=== Background as High Kings of Ireland ===
The kingdom was founded by the Laighin, a Heremonian tribe of Irish Gaels: that is to say the rulership group claimed descent in the paternal line from Érimón, son of Míl Espáine (though other groups of Irish Gaels also lived within the territory of the Kingdom of Leinster) and has provided many early High Kings of Ireland. The branch which became the Laighin had been in power struggle with the Érainn kinship group of the Corcu Loígde, also known as the Dáirine, a fellow Heremonian tribe, for hegemony in Ireland.

According to traditional Irish history found in the Annals of the Four Masters, the earliest King of Leinster of note was Úgaine Mór, who was a High King of Ireland and had as his wife and queen, Cessair Chrothach, supposedly Gaulish woman (that is to say a member of a Celtic group from Continental Europe). The histories of this period describe a lot of internal bloodshedding between different members of the royal family as they ruthlessly vied for the High Kingship of Ireland: Úgaine Mór was supposedly killed by his own brother Bodbchadh, who subsequently reigned as High King of Ireland for a mere day and a half until himself being killed by his nephew Lóegaire Lorc, son of Úgaine Mór. He was not the only child of Úgaine Mór, as he supposedly had at least 25 offspring (twenty-two sons and three daughters) and is said to have parcelled out vast swathes of land in Ireland among his children.

Lóegaire's older brother Cobthach Cóel Breg was also an ambitious man and after seeking advice from a Druid, slew his brother in a treacherous manner. Cobthach carried this out by pretending to be on his death bed and when his brother Lóegaire Lorc lent over his body in grief, jumped up and stabbed his own brother to death. After seizing the High Kingship for himself, Cobthach proceeded to have Lóegaire Lorc's son Ailill Áine poisoned to death and forced his grandson Labhraidh Loingseach into exile in Gaul, on the European Continent. Stories of the period relate that, before leaving for the Continent, Cobthach supposedly forced his great-nephew Labhradh to eat part of his slain father and grandfather's hearts (in an act of involuntary cannibalism), as well as a mouse. Labhradh stayed out his exile on the European Continent for thirty years, living principally amongst the Gauls (his grandmother, queen Cessair Chrothach, was supposedly Gaulish).

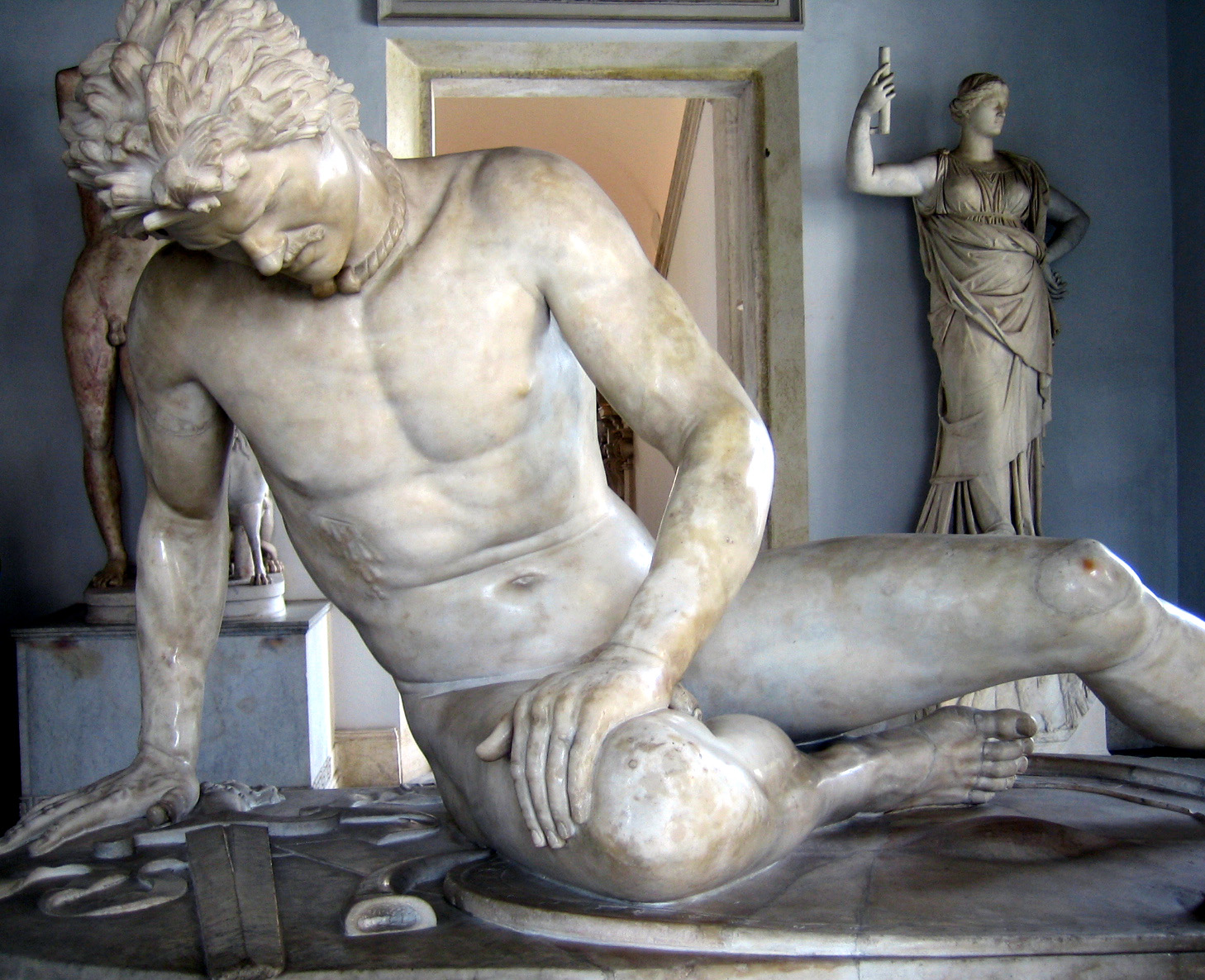
The Dying Gaul. According to Irish tradition, the name Leinster derives from the spears carried by the Gaul mercenaries brought back by the exile Labhraidh Loingseach to secure his kingdom.

The period in which Labradh was exiled is dated to around the 3rd century BC, when the Roman–Gallic wars were then raging as the Transalpine Gauls were starting to push over the Alps into Etruria, towards the Roman Republic. Here Labhradh came across fearsome Gallic warriors known as the Gaesatae, who have been described as wielding spears and shields, rushing into battle naked. They were famous for some impressive military feats in their clashes with the Romans, such as those at the Battles of Faesulae, Telamon and Clastidium with Rome. The Gaesatae were immortalised in artistic form in the Dying Gaul sculpture, an ancient Roman marble held in the Capitoline Museums.

After three decades of hostility, Cobthach and Labhradh made peace, with the latter returning to Ireland. As a reward for recognising his great-uncle as High King of Ireland, Labhradh was rewarded with "Galióin", the territorial basis of what would become Kingdom of Leinster. Galióin was used interchangeably with Laigin in the Annals: the term derives from the same root as the above-mentioned Gaesatae (the Gaulish mercenaries). The term Laigin itself supposedly etymologically refers to the broad-pointed spears of the Gaulish mercenaries which Labhradh brought to protect the realm. According to Francis John Byrne, "identical with or closely associated", with these two terms for Leinster was Fir Domnann; it is unclear if these were distinct groups of Celtic people later synthesised into one group, or simply different names for one group of people. The name is associated with the Dumnonii in Great Britain, who would become the basis for the Cornish people. After biding his time, Labhradh eventually waged a war on his great-uncle, winning the High Kingship of Ireland and avenge the murder of his progenitors, burning Cobthach and his followers to death at an iron house in Dind Ríg. The familiar pattern of fratricide continued as Labhradh was killed by his own nephew Meilge Molbthach. Eventually, after several more generations, the family lost control of the High Kingship, with the rise of the Connachta, also a Heremonian tribe, who descend from Óengus Tuirmech Temrach.

=== Viking raids and revival ===
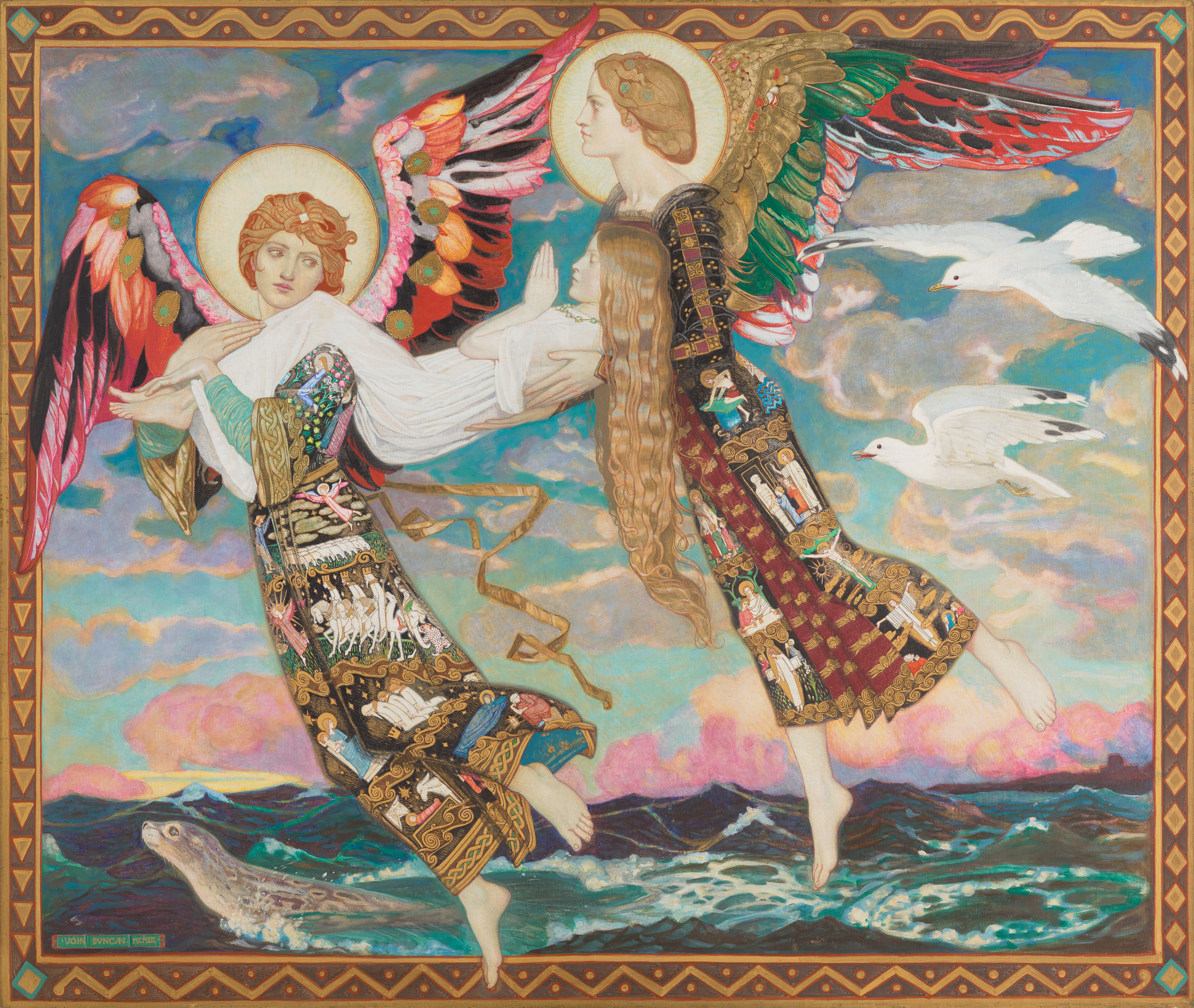
St. Brigid of Kildare, carried by two angels, painted by John Duncan. She was invoked as protectoress of Leinster and control of Kildare was essential for the Kings of Leinster.

The kingdom was later raided and invaded by Viking forces from the 8th century onwards, and by the 9th century, Dublin had become a major Viking settlement and trading center. Some of the Christian monasteries within the kingdom were sacked by them such as St Mullin's.

In the late 10th century, a dynasty known as the Uí Cheinnselaig emerged as the dominant force in Leinster.

=== Norman invasion and losses ===
The most famous king of this dynasty was Diarmait Mac Murchada, who ruled from 1126 to 1171. Diarmait was a powerful and ambitious king who sought to expand his territory and influence, and he was involved in several wars and alliances with other Irish kings.

In 1166, however, Diarmait was expelled from his kingdom by the High King of Ireland, Ruaidrí Ua Conchobair. Diarmait fled to England, where he sought the support of King Henry II, and in 1170, he returned to Ireland with a force of Norman knights. With their help, he was able to reclaim his kingdom and become even more powerful than before.

=== The Kavanaghs and resistance ===
Diarmait had several sons, one of whom was named Donnchad mac Murchada. Donnchad became the king of Leinster after his father's death in 1171, but he was forced to share power with his half-brother, Conchobar Mac Murchada. Donnchad's descendants became known as the Kavanagh dynasty, and they continued to hold power in Leinster for centuries.

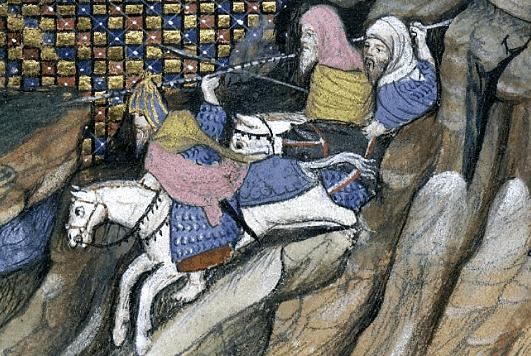
Art Óg Mac Murchadha Caomhánach, King of Leinster in the late 14th century revived the fortunes of the kingdom and clashed with Richard II Plantagenet, King of England.

The Kavanaghs were known for their fierce resistance to the Lordship of Ireland associated with the Kingdom of England, and they frequently clashed with the forces of the Pale in the late medieval period. One of the most famous Kavanagh kings was Art MacMurrough-Kavanagh, who ruled from 1375 to 1417. Art was a powerful and charismatic leader who was known for his military prowess and his fierce determination to defend his kingdom from English encroachment.

Leinster remained a powerful kingdom throughout the medieval period, but it gradually lost its independence as the English Crown extended its authority over Ireland. In the 16th century, Leinster was incorporated into the English-controlled Province of Leinster as part of the Kingdom of Ireland, which included much of eastern Ireland.

=== Legacy ===
Today, Leinster is one of the four provinces of Ireland, and it is home to several of Ireland's largest cities, including Dublin, Kilkenny, and Wexford.

== Christianity ==
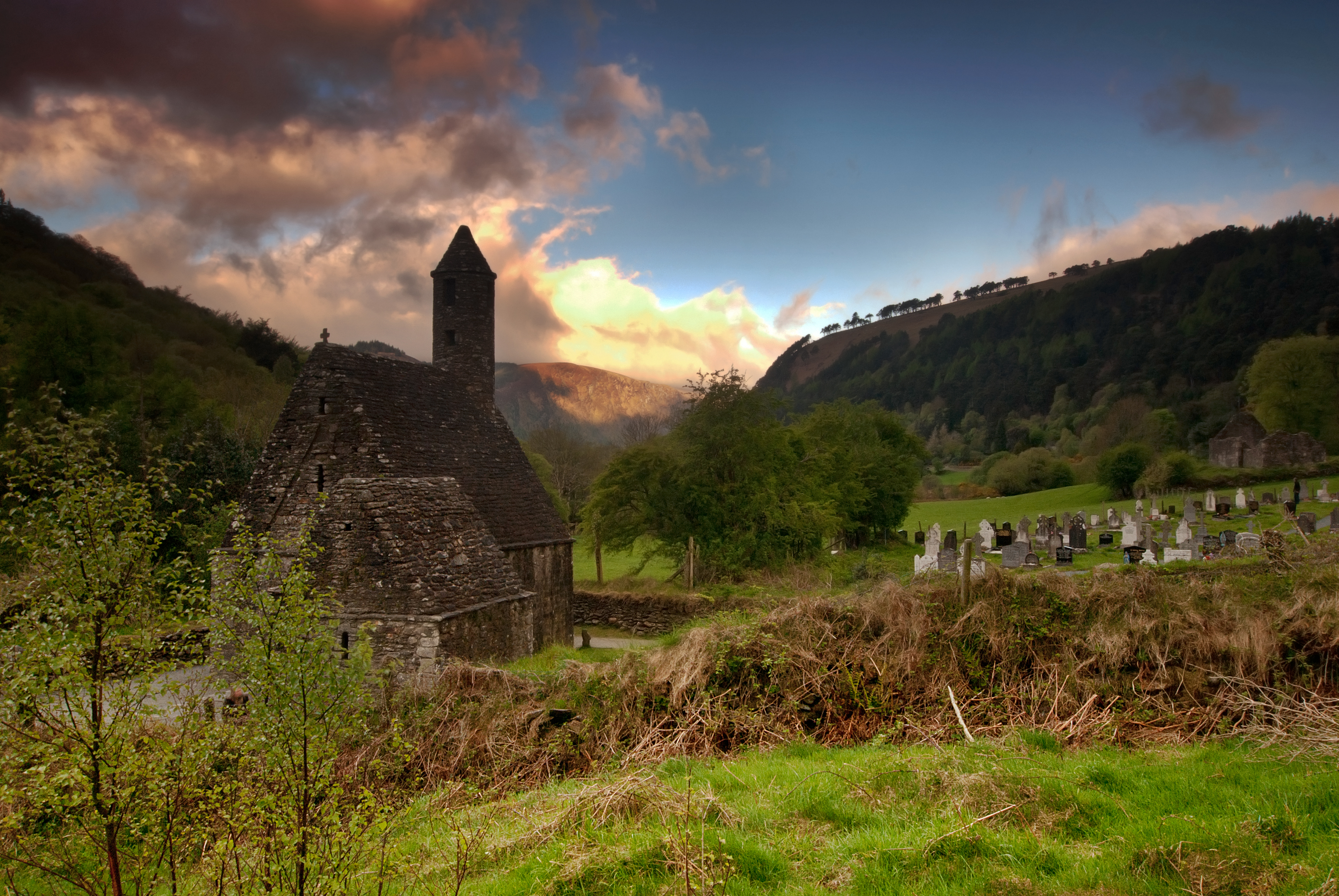
Glendalough Monastery founded by Kevin of Glendalough, a prince of royal Leinster blood. Located in a valley in the Wicklow Mountains, the monastery was founded in the 6th century.

Although founded in the pagan Gaelic tradition era, the religion which came to predominate at an official level in Leinster was Catholic Christianity. Indeed, it is through Leinster and the neighbouring Kingdom of Munster, that Christianity in Ireland first took root, even before the arrival of St. Patrick. One of the best known pre-Patrician saints of Ireland, Abbán, was a Leinsterman. Saints from Leinster were also represented among the Twelve Apostles of Ireland. Some of the more prominent monasteries founded by Irish Gaels in Leinster from the 5th to the 8th centuries include; Kildare Abbey founded by Brigid of Kildare (a patron saint of Ireland), Glendalough Monastery founded by Kevin of Glendalough, Clonard Abbey founded by Finnian of Clonard, Ferns Abbey founded by Máedóc of Ferns, Tallaght Monastery founded by Máel Ruain (part of the Culdee movement) and St Mullin's Monastery founded by Mo Ling (where the Book of Mulling originated).

By the early 12th century, the Synod of Ráth Breasail took place which moved the organisation of the Church in Ireland from one based on monasteries, to the diocesan model popular throughout the rest of Latin Christendom. The geographical boundaries of these dioceses represented in Ireland to some extent aspects of local tribal territorial control and in Leinster this was no different, with its north–south dynamic; the Uí Ceinnselaig were associated with the Diocese of Ferns and Diocese of Leighlin in the south, while the Diocese of Kildare, Diocese of Glendalough and Archdiocese of Dublin in the north were associated with the Uí Dúnlainge's historical area of control. Although it should be noted, by the time of the Synod, the Norse Vikings from Scandinavia had set up their Kingdom of Dublin from territory previously belonging to Leinster (control of which was contest at various times by the Uí Ímair, the Ó Briain and the Mac Murchadha). Until the Synod of Kells in 1152, the small walled Norse enclave at Dublin had the unusual distinction of being part of the Province of Canterbury unlike the rest of the Church in Ireland, while Glendalough was associated with the Gaels of Leinster in the same area. In 1216, during the reigns of Pope Innocent III and Pope Honorius III, the Archdiocese of Dublin and Glendalough were merged.

As a consequence of the Norman invasion of Ireland, by the 13th century, control of the diocese and the positions within the episcopate within Leinster had been taken over by those of foreign origin (namely the Normans in Ireland). A couple of late examples of positions held by Leinstermen, include St. Lorcán Ó Tuathail, the Archbishop of Dublin, previously the Abbot of Glendalough, who was involved in implementing the Gregorian Reform in Ireland and took part in the Synod of Cashel. He also attended the Third Council of the Lateran in Rome under Pope Alexander III. Another native Irish cleric in Leinster, born in the following generation, Ailbe Ó Maíl Mhuaidh, Bishop of Ferns, would attend the Fourth Council of the Lateran in Rome under Pope Innocent III. He was nationalistic, opposed to the meddling of foreign clergy in Ireland and excommunicated William Marshal, one of the leading Norman invaders.

== See also ==
- Book of Leinster
- Short Annals of Leinster
- Leabhar Branach
