= Murrisk (barony) =

Murrisk Muraisc (Irish)
- Barony
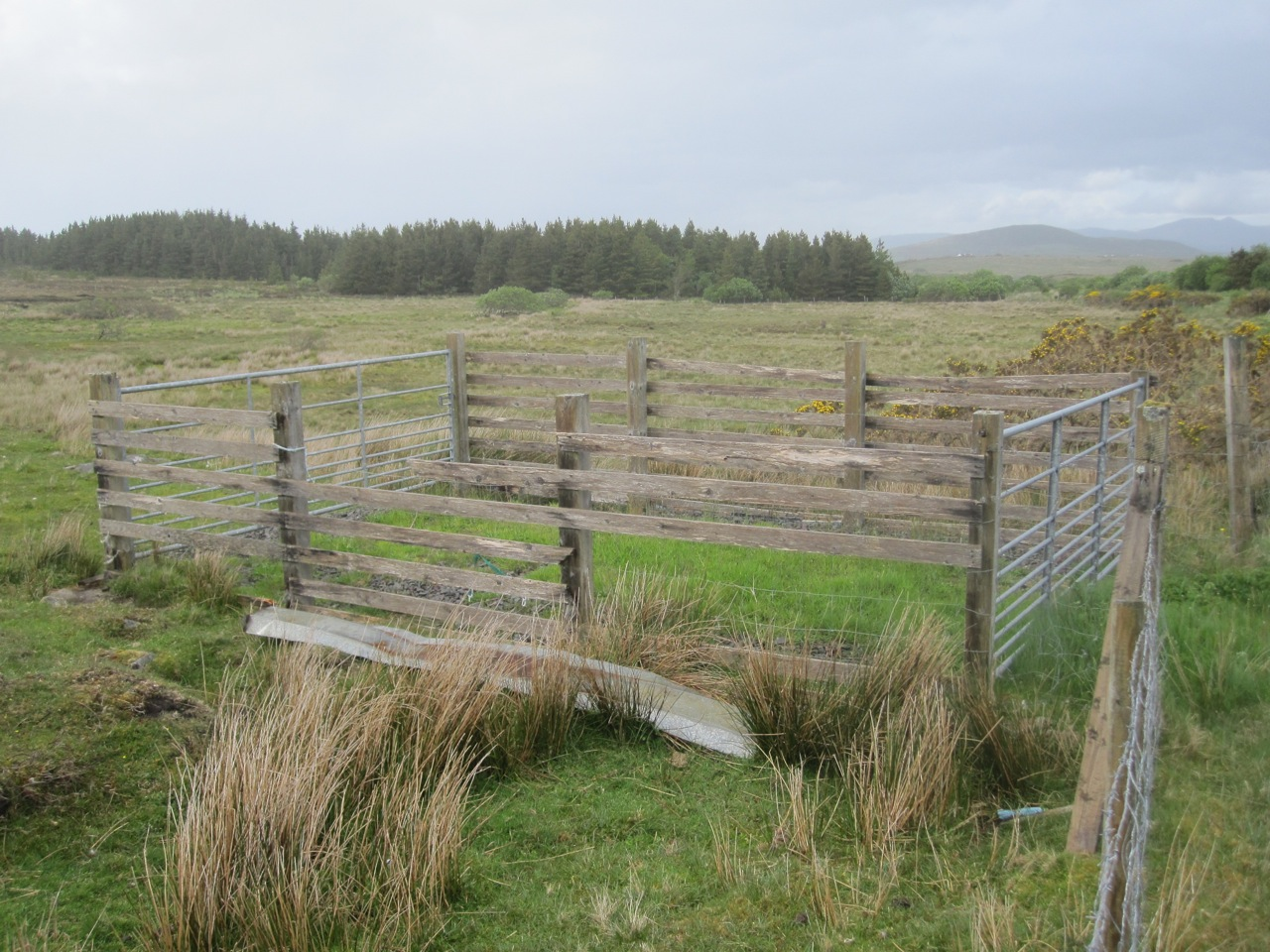
- Sheep pen (near to Tully, Kilgeever)

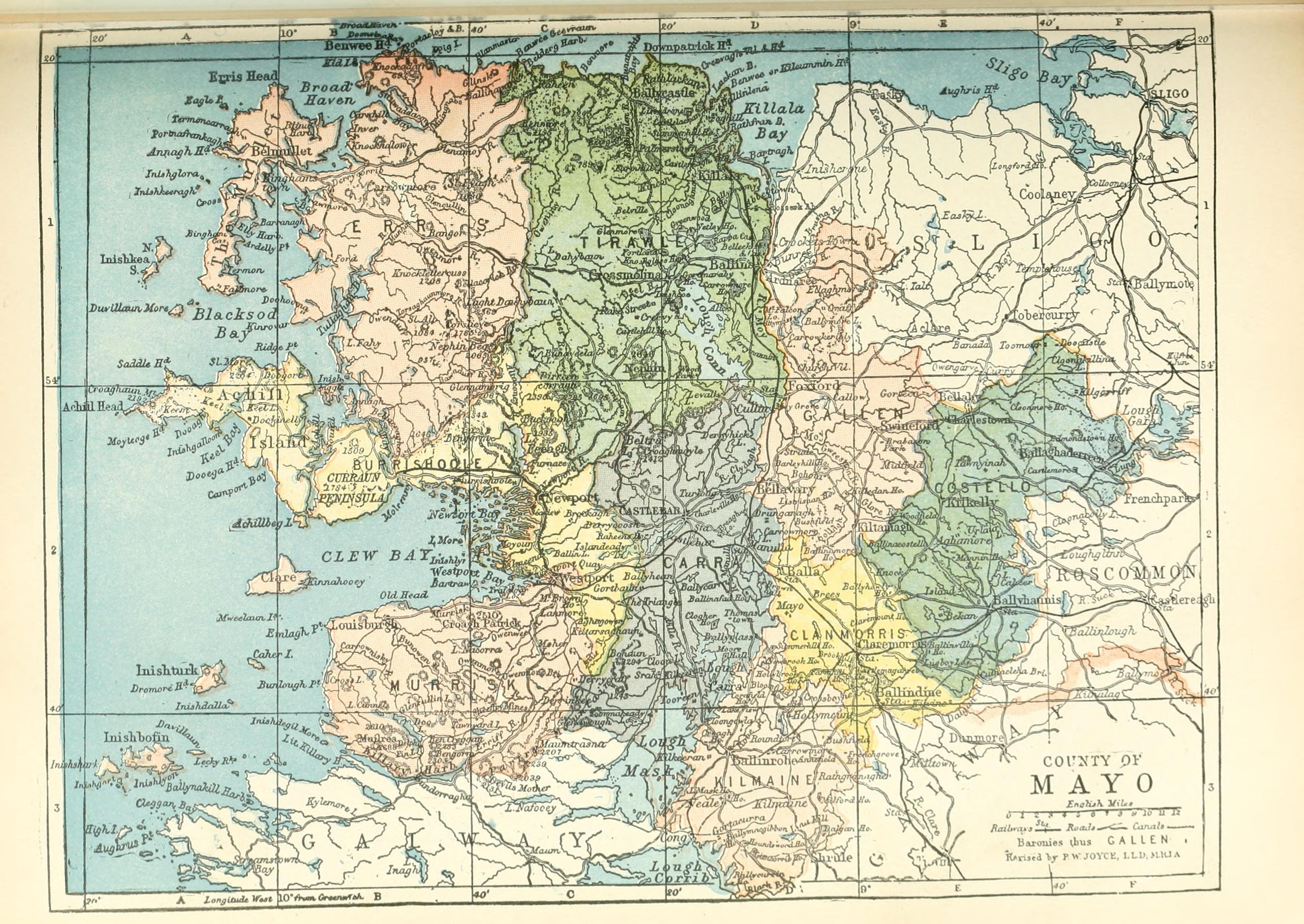
- Barony map of County Mayo, 1900; Murrisk (pink) is situated in the southwest.

- Location within Ireland
- Coordinates: 53°44′N 9°48′W
- Sovereign state: Ireland
- Province: Connacht
- County: Mayo

Area
  - Total: 554.7 km^{2} (214.2 sq mi)

Murrisk (Irish: Muraisc) is one of the baronies of County Mayo, in the southwest of the county. It lies between Clew Bay to the north and Killary Harbour to the south. Murrisk has an area of 544 km², and includes Clare Island and Inishturk.

It's bordered by the barony of Burrishoole to the north and east, of Carra to the southeast, and the County Galway baronies of Ballynahinch and Ross to the south.

It was known historically as the territory of Upper Owel. Together with the barony of Burrishoole (Buiríos Umhaill, or Lower Owel) it formed part of the area known as the 'Owles', or 'Owels' (Umhaill). The name Murrisk derives ultimately from the place-name Mag Muirisce associated with the legendary figure Muirisc.

== Towns and villages in Murrisk ==
- Murrisk
- Louisburgh
- Westport
- Carrownisky
