= Muirisc =

Princess from Mag Muirisce

Muirisc, Muireasc, or Muireasg was a legendary but possibly historical woman who ruled over a territory called Mag Muirisce (later the Barony of Murrisk) in what is now County Mayo.

== Biography ==
What little is now known about Muirisc can be traced to two short medieval poetic references.

Muirisc was given rule by her father, Úgaine Mór (a.k.a. Hugony the Great), the sixty-sixth high king of Ireland who is said to have divided Ireland into twenty-five shares, one for each of his children. Her siblings included Lóegaire Lorc (who ruled Life), Cobthach Cóel Breg (who ruled Bregia), as well as a sister named Lathar.

Muirisc placed her stronghold near Clew Bay in the shadow of Cruachan Aigli (Conical Mountain), now known as Croagh Patrick. She was known as a sea captain and a warrior who "ruled o'er hardy sailors and great men" and was famed as much for being "daring" and "bold" as she was for her beauty and "snowy hands."

== Timeframe ==
Estimates vary across a 1,100-year span as to when Muirisc (as well as her father) may have lived—from around the year 500 of the Common Era to as far back as 600 Before the Common Era.
