= Kilgeever Abbey =

- Kilgeever Church
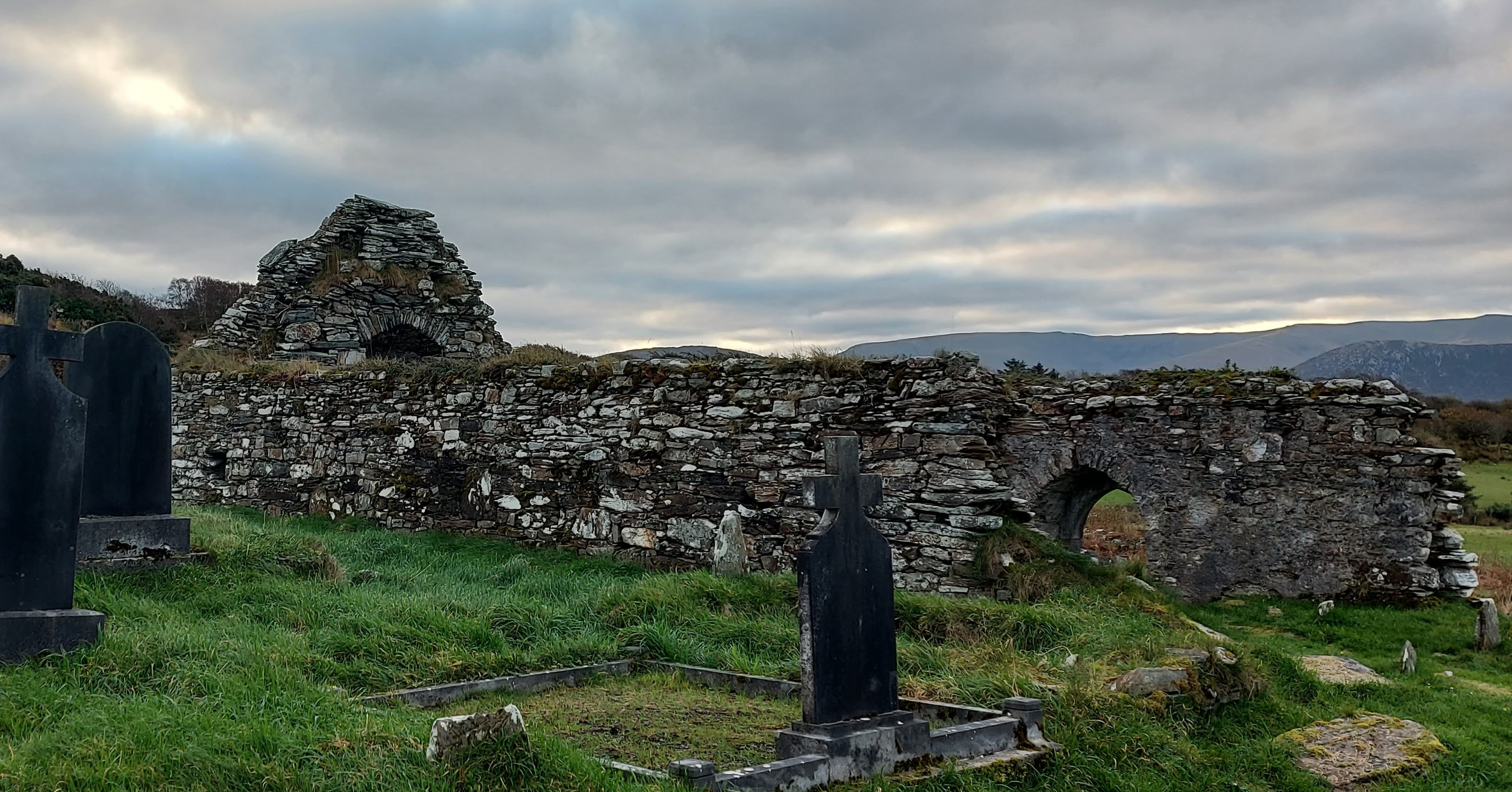
- Kilgeever Abbey

- Location within Ireland
- 53°45′40.4″N 9°46′02.1″W
- Location: Kilgeever, Murrisk, County Mayo, Ireland
- Denomination: Roman Catholic

Kilgeever Abbey, or Kilgeever Church, is a historical site near Louisburgh in the parish of Kilgeever, in the barony of Murrisk, County Mayo in Ireland. The site consists of a ruined church, a graveyard and a holy well, where pilgrimages or patterns take place. The site is part of the Clew Bay Archaeological Trail. The church was built in the 12th century on the site of an earlier Patrician chapel. The graveyard on the site is suggested to be from Early Christian times and continues to be in use. Within the graveyard, there is a pillar stone incised with a cross, the graveyard also contained a free-standing stone and a portable stone cross with incised crosses which are now in private ownership.

== History ==
The name Kilgeever or Cill Chaobhair in Irish can be translated as the Near Church, the Windy Church, or St. Iomhair's Church. However, the name St. Iomhair is not recorded in Ó Riain's Dictionary of Irish Saints. Local legend tells of St. Patrick visiting the site after fasting on Croagh Patrick for forty days and forty nights, he then decided to build a church for which he assigned St. Iomhair this task. In John O’Donovan’s Ordnance Survey letters of 1838, he calls the church St. Geever's Church.

The church building, holy well and pillar stone are recorded, by the National Monument Service, in the Record of Monuments and Places for County Mayo. In 2021 Kilgeever Abbey received over €10,000 in government funding under the Community Monument Fund to support the protection, conservation, maintenance and promotion of local monuments and historic sites.

== Architecture ==
=== Church building ===
The church at Kilgeever is built on the site of an earlier Patrician church. There is little surviving historical information on the church building, it measures 16.6m, east-west and 5.1m north-south. There is a round-headed window in the east, typical of twelfth century Romanesque architecture in Ireland. The church was later modified to include a new Gothic-style door. The door dating to the fifteenth century has a pock-dressed arch and a drawbar as a locking mechanism. There are only foundations remaining of the western gable. Votive offerings were found in the left aumbry in the east end of the church, two niches in the east also contained vessels.

=== Pillar stone ===
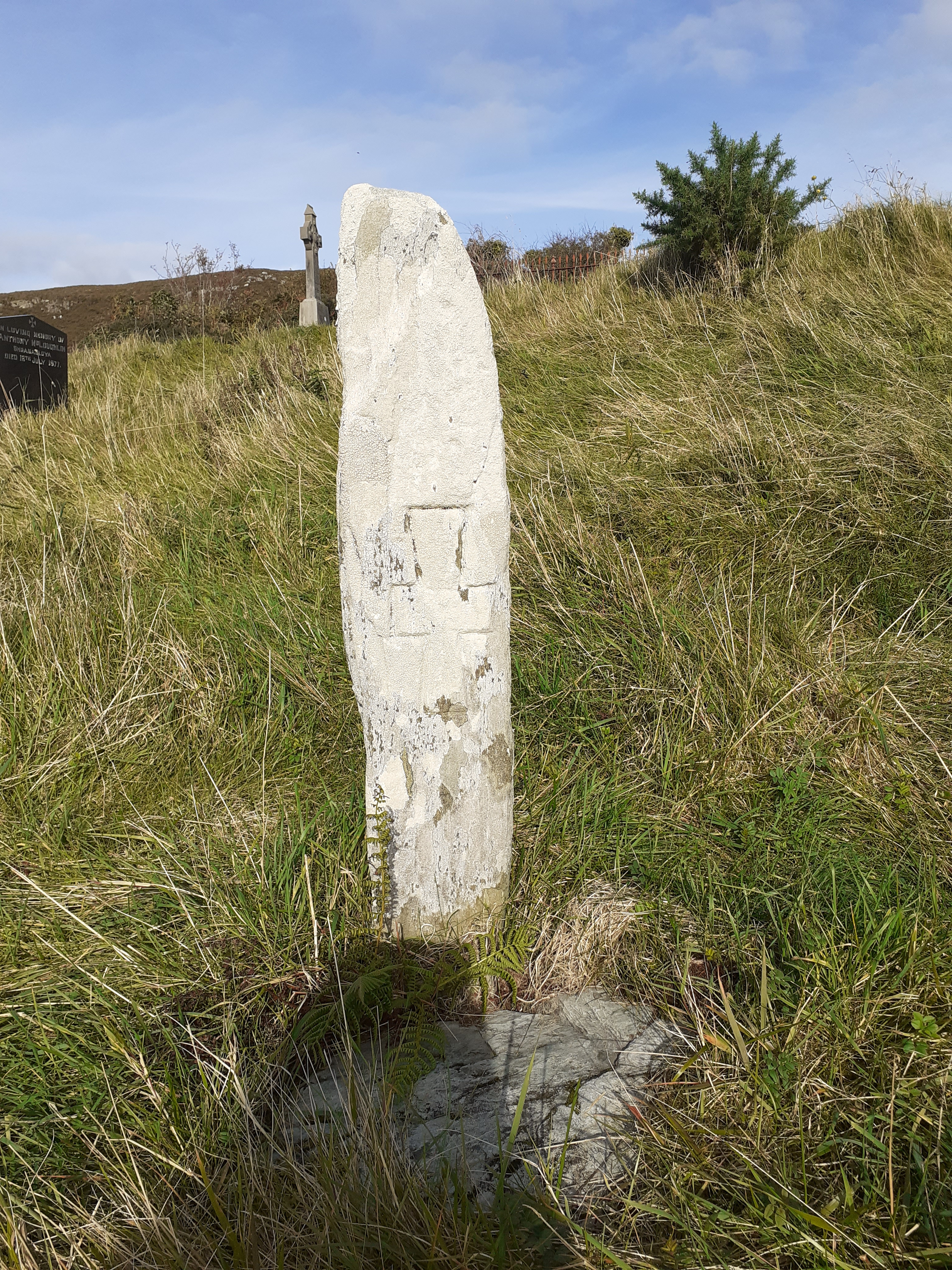
Medieval pillar stone

The stone is schist or slate, measuring 90cm high and 16.3cm wide, and marks a grave placed on high ground. The stone is incised with a cross with dove-tail terminals of unequal-length arms, suggested to be carved with a small sharp instrument.

=== Free standing stone ===
This stone now in private ownership is said to be schist measuring 83cm high, 5.2cm deep and 35cm wide. The stone has a cross incised on one side, which is suggested was carved with a small blunt instrument. The cross is similar to a Maltese Cross with unequal arms, the top of the stone was badly damaged.

=== Small portable cross stone ===
A small stone with a Latin cross inscribed with triangular terminals was found between 1965-1970, which is now in private possession. It is a schist tabular stone in a crude cruciform shape of a Latin cross, the stone measures 13.2cm long, 9.1cm across and 2.1-3.4cm wide. The stone is decorated with pock marks forming circular and cruciform patterns. Similar crosses from the Early Christian period were found at Inishbofin, County Galway and Skellig Michael and Valentia Island, County Kerry.

=== Holy well and pilgrimage ===
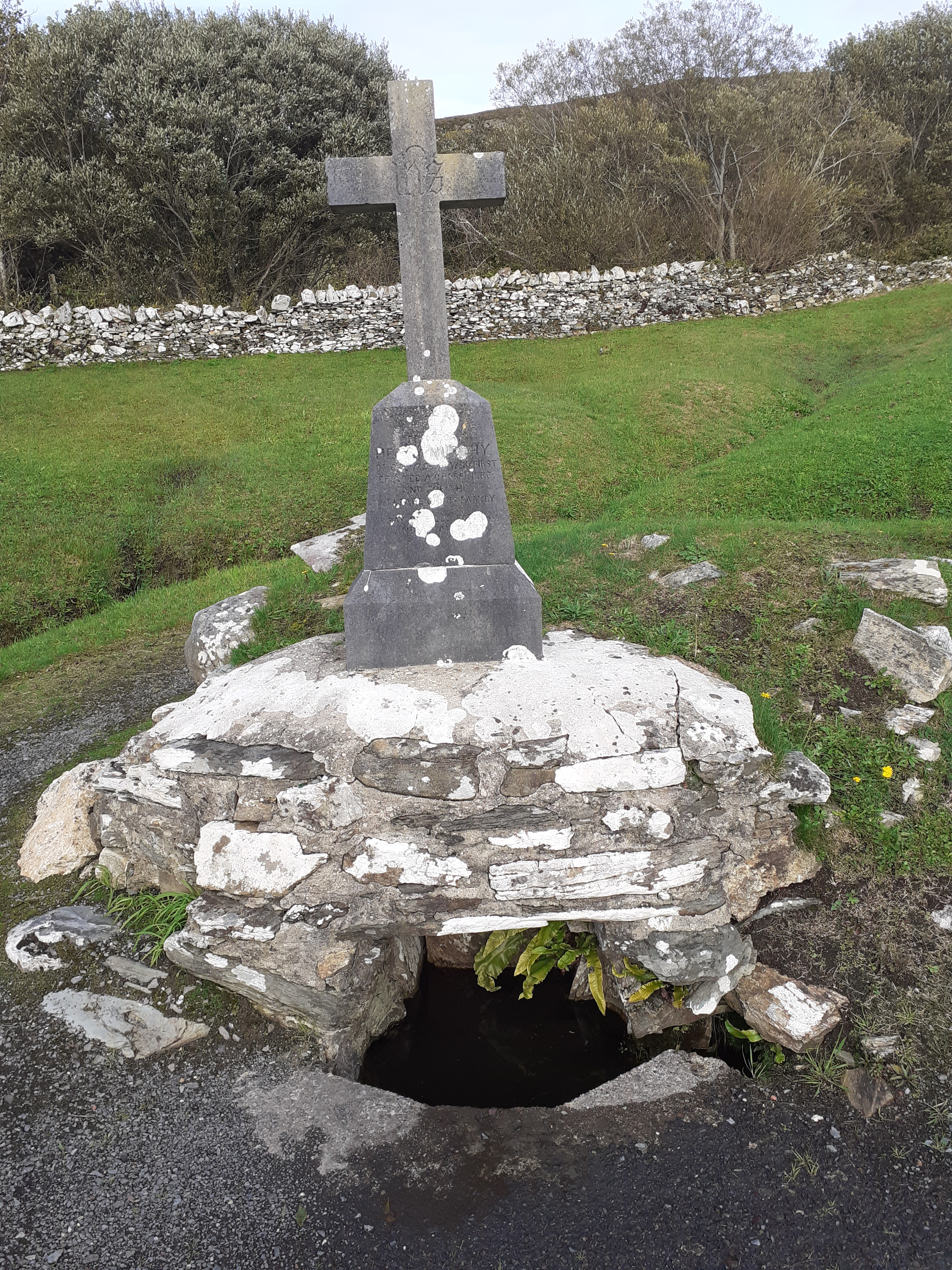
Holy Well at Kilgeever

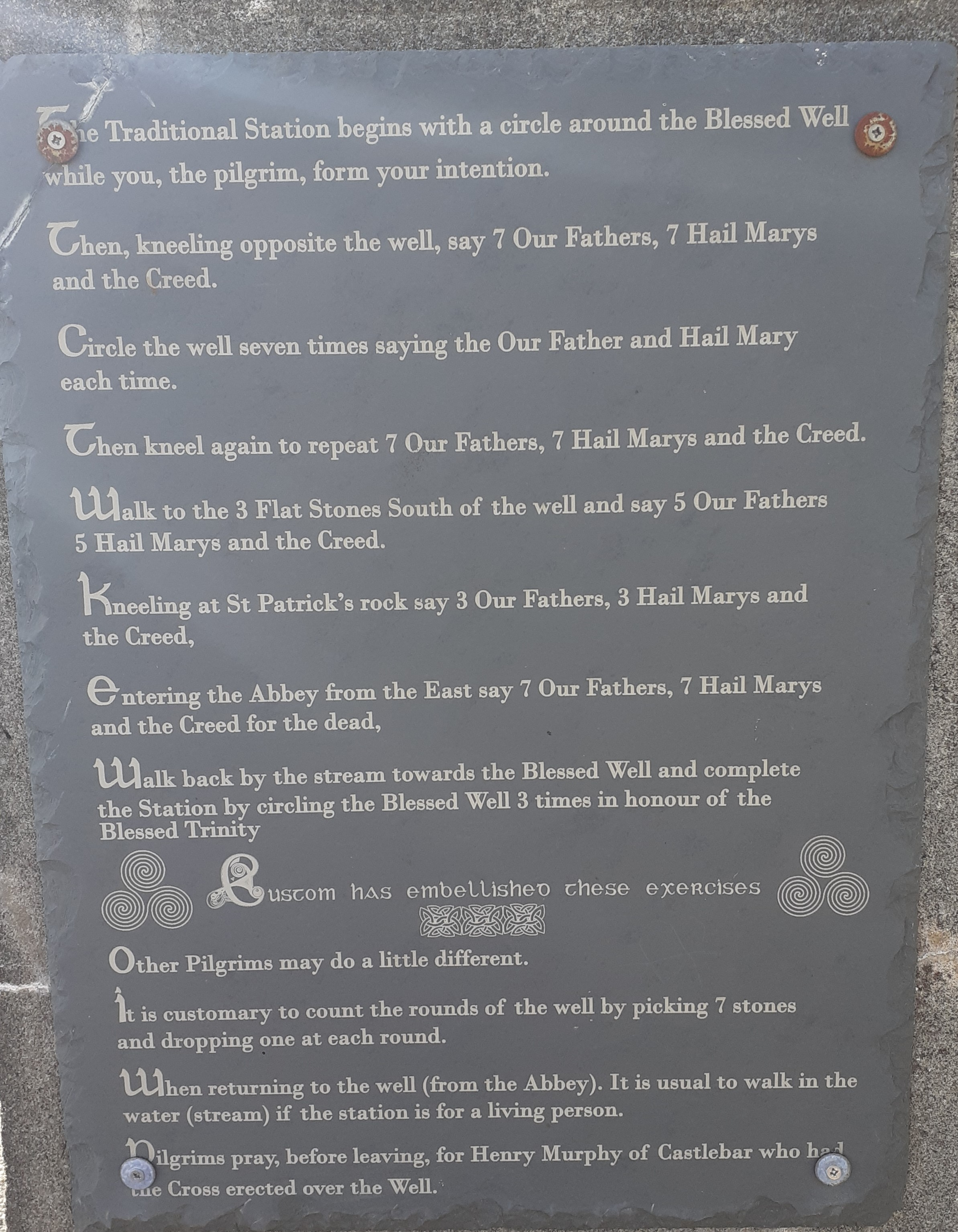
Plaque describing pattern at Kilgeever

The well is named Toberrendoney an anglicised version of Tober Rí an Dhomhnaig (Our Lord's Well of the Sabbath) on the six-inch Ordnance Survey Cassini map (1821-1841). There is an annual pilgrimage or pattern performed at the site on the 15 August. The pattern was part of a larger pilgrimage to Croagh Patrick and Caher Island. Rounds of the holy well are completed by pilgrims, there is a plaque in-situ explaining the devotional practice adhered to each year.

Traditionally the pilgrimage took place on the 15 July, as recorded on the Ordnance Survey letters of 1838, which was the pattern day. By the time the Irish Tourist Association completed its survey in the 1940s the pilgrimage was changed to the 15 August until the 8 September. The site is also visited on Reek Sunday which is the last Sunday in July, when the annual pilgrimage to Croagh Patrick takes place.

As part of the pattern pilgrims incise a cross into a rock. A cross is also incised on the nineteenth century headstone of the MacEvilly family grave.

Before leaving the site pilgrims pray for Henry Murphy who had a cross erected over the holy well.
