= Lecanvey =

Lecanvey Leac an Anfa / Leic Ainimhe
- Village
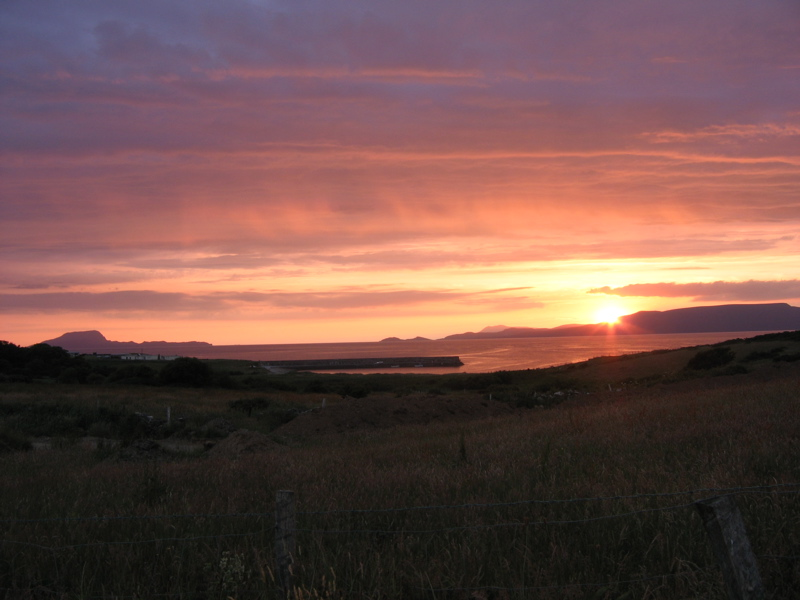
- Sun set on Achill Island over Clew Bay with Lecanvey Pier in the midground and Clare Island on the horizon

- Location in Ireland
- Coordinates: 53°46′30″N 9°41′15″W
- Country: Ireland
- Province: Connacht
- County: County Mayo
- Elevation: 205 m (673 ft)
- Time zone: UTC+0 (WET)
  - Summer (DST): UTC-1 (IST (WEST))
- Irish Grid Reference: L887819

Lecanvey (Irish: Leac an Anfa) or Leckanvy (Irish: Leic Ainimhe) is a seaside village in County Mayo, Ireland, between Westport and Louisburgh, about 2 km west of Murrisk. It has a small beach with Lecanvey Pier. To the south is Croagh Patrick. To the west is Clare Island.

The Lecanvey Community Alliance was constituted in 2006, with the intent to improve the environment of the parts of the area which do not fall into the catchment area of Murrisk or of Louisburgh.

== Transport ==
=== Road ===
Lecanvey is located on the R335 regional road.

Bus Éireann local route 450 Louisburgh-Lecanvey-Murrisk-Westport provides two to three journeys in each direction daily except Sundays. On Thursdays the route extends west to Killadoon.

=== Rail access ===
The nearest rail services may be accessed at Westport railway station, which is located approximately 15 km from the settlement.

== Townlands served by the Lecanvey Community Alliance ==
Name	Ainm	Meaning	Area
Bouris (OS maps: Boheh)	An Bhuiríos (or Both Theith)	'the fortified settlement' or 'the warm hut'	360 acres (1.5 km^{2})
Carrowmacloughlin	Ceathrú Mhic Lochlainn	'MacLoughlin's quarter'	600 acres (2.4 km^{2})
Cartoor	Cartúr	'a parcel of land 64 acres (260,000 m^{2})'	132 acres (0.53 km^{2})
Durless	Dúir Lios	'strong fort'	1,092 acres (4.42 km^{2})
Furrigal (OS maps: Furgill)	Fóirghiall	'pledge for protection, hostage for safety'	439 acres (1.78 km^{2})
Glenbaun	An Gleann Bán	'the white valley'	338 acres (1.37 km^{2})
Glencally	Gleann an Calaidh	'glen of the marshy meadow'	511 acres (2.07 km^{2})
Gloshpatrick (OS maps: Glaspatrick)	Glais Phádraig	'Patrick's streambed'	823 acres (3.33 km^{2})
Gorteendarragh	Goirtín Darach	'little oak field'	12 acres (49,000 m^{2})
Kilsallagh Lower	Coill Saileach Íochtair	'lower wood of willows'	702 acres (2.84 km^{2})
Kilsallagh Upper	Coill Saileach Uachtair	'upper wood of willows'	347 acres (1.40 km^{2})
Kinnock (OS maps: Kinknock)	Ceann Cnoic	'head of the rock'	279 acres (1.13 km^{2})
Lecanvey (OS maps: Leckanvy)	Leac an Anfa	'flagstone of the storm'	786 acres (3.18 km^{2})
Lecanvey Pier	Cé Leac an Anfa	not a proper townland	
Mullagh	Mullach	'summit'	339 acres (1.37 km^{2})
Tangincartoor	Teanga an Chartúir	'Cartoor's tongue'	234 acres (0.95 km^{2})
Thornhill	Cnoc Sceichín	'hill of the hawthorn'	307 acres (1.24 km^{2})

== Notable residents ==
The Iranian-American author Marsha Mehran rented a house in Lecanvey, where she died in April 2014.

== See also ==
- List of towns and villages in Ireland
