= Glenans Ireland =

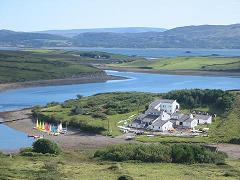
Glenans base on Collanmore Island

Glenans Irish Sailing Club (GISC) was a non-profit sailing school affiliated to, but independent of the larger French Les Glénans sailing school. The Irish club was founded in 1969 as part of the French school. It gained independence in 1985, operating successfully for 25 years, but following an economic downturn it was reintegrated with the French school in 2010. Glenans Irish Sailing Club offered courses in cruisers, catamarans, dinghies and windsurfing. The sailing bases were in Lawrence Cove on Bere Island County Cork, Collanmore Island in Clew Bay, and the club's original base (founded in 1969) at a converted railway station in Baltimore, County Cork. The Baltimore and Collanmore bases were re-integrated as part of the Les Glénans school but subsequently closed in 2013.

The club operated largely using volunteer instructors, backed by a small professional staff on the bases and in the Baltimore office.

A successor organisation, Baltimore Maritime Centre was formed in 2014 with a view to continuing sail training in Baltimore.
