= Úgaine Mór =

66th High King of Ireland

Úgaine Mór, son of Eochu Buadach, son of Dui Ladrach, was, according to medieval Irish legend and historical tradition, the 66th High King of Ireland.

== Biography ==
He was the foster-son of Cimbáeth and Macha Mong Ruad and he took power by killing his predecessor (and his foster-mother's killer), Rechtaid Rígderg. The Lebor Gabála Érenn says that, as well as Ireland, he ruled "Alba to the Sea of Wight" – i.e. the whole of the island of Britain – and that "some say" he ruled all of Europe.

He married Cessair Chrothach, daughter of the king of the Gauls, who bore him twenty-two sons and three daughters. He is said to have divided Ireland into twenty-five shares, one for each of his children. For example, his son Lóegaire Lorc ruled Life and Cobthach Cóel Breg ruled Bregia. His daughter Muirisc ruled Mag Muirisce, from which Murrisk is said to have taken its name. This partitioning of the island stood for three hundred years, until the establishment of the provinces under Eochu Feidlech.

The reign of Úgaine Mór was thirty or forty years, until he was killed by his brother Bodbchad. According to the Lebor Gabála, he was succeeded directly by his son Lóegaire Lorc, although the Annals of the Four Masters and Geoffrey Keating's Foras Feasa ar Éirinn say Bodbchad was king for a day and a half until Lóegaire killed him. Cobthach Cóel Breg succeeded his brother Loegaire.

== Timeframe ==
The Lebor Gabála synchronises Úgaine Mór's reign to that of Ptolemy II Philadelphus (281–246 BCE). Roderick O’Flaherty in Ogygia (1685) has his reign begin "the year in which Alexander conquered Darius" and last thirty years (331-301 BCE). The chronology of Keating's Foras Feasa ar Éirinn dates his reign to 441–411 BCE and the Annals of the Four Masters to 634–594 BCE.

== Issue ==
The following is a list of children that Úgaine Mór fathered, along with the land he passed unto them. It is said he had twenty-two sons and three daughters. Annals of the Kingdom of Ireland by John O'Donovan lists twenty-five children (twenty-two sons and three daughters), but does not list another apparent child of Úgaine Mór, a daughter called "Lathar" (not to be confused with Latharn).

1. Cobhthach Cael Breg, High King of Ireland, received "Breagh, or Bregia"
2. Cobhthach Minn, Prince of Ireland, received "Muirtheimhne in the new country of Louth"
3. Laeghair Lorc, High King of Ireland, received "the Lands of the River Liffey, in Leinster"
4. Fuilne, Prince of Ireland, received "Magh-Fea, in the county of Carlow"
5. Nar, Prince of Ireland, received "Magh-Nair"
6. Raighne, Prince of Ireland, received "Magh-Raigne, in Ossory"
7. Narbh, Prince of Ireland, received "Magh-Narbh"
8. Cinga, Prince of Ireland, received "Aigeatross, on the River Nore"
9. Tair, Prince of Ireland, received "Magh-Tarra"
10. Triath, Prince of Ireland, received "Treitherne"
11. Sen, Prince of Ireland, received "Luachair-Deaghaidh, in Kerry"
12. Bard, Prince of Ireland, received "Cluain-Corca-Oiche, in Ui-Fodhgheinte"
13. Fergus Gnoi, Prince of Ireland, received "the southern Deisi"
14. Orb, Prince of Ireland, received "Aidhne, in the diocese of Kilmacduagh"
15. Moen, Prince of Ireland, received "Moenmhag, in Clanrickard, in the now country of Galway"
16. Sanbh, Prince of Ireland, received "Magh-Aei, in the now country of Roscommon"
17. Muireadbach Mal, Prince of Ireland, received "Cliu-Mail"
18. Eochaidh, Prince of Ireland, received "Seolmhagh, now the barony of Clare, county of Galway"
19. Latharn, Prince of Ireland, received "Latharna, in the county of Antrim"
20. Mare, Prince of Ireland, received "Midhe"
21. Laegh, Prince of Ireland, received "Line, or Magh-Line, county of Antrim"
22. Cairbre, Prince of Ireland, received "Corann, the new county of Sligo"
23. Ailbhe, Princess of Ireland, received "Magh-Ailbhe, in the present county of Kildare"
24. Aeife or Eva, Princess of Ireland, received "Magh-Aeife, otherwise called Magh-Feimheann, now Iffa and Offa East, in the county of Tipperary"
25. Muirisc, Princess of Ireland, received "Mag-Muirisce"

(–) Lathar, Princess of Ireland

"Ugaine reputedly gave Lathar a stretch of land along the coast of County Antrim, from Glenarm to the Inver; which would one day make Larne."

| Preceded by Rechtaid Rígderg | High King of Ireland; LGE 3rd century BC; FFE 441–411 BC; AFM 634–594 BC | Succeeded by Bodbchad or Lóegaire Lorc |
