= Marsha Mehran =

Iranian novelist (1977–2014)

- Born: Mahsa Mehran; November 11, 1977; Tehran, Iran
- Died: April 2014 (aged 36); Lecanvey, County Mayo, Ireland
- Occupation: Novelist
- Partner: Christopher Collins (divorced in 2013)
- Website: www.marshamehran.com

Signature
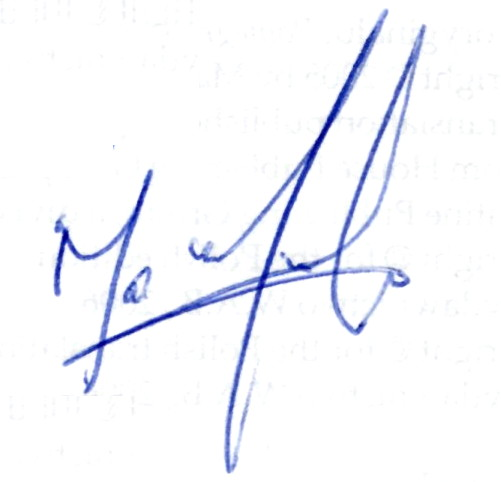

Marsha Mehran (Persian: مارشا مهران; born Mahsa Mehran; 11 November 1977 – April 2014) was an Iranian novelist. Her works include the international bestsellers Pomegranate Soup (2005) and Rosewater and Soda Bread (2008).

== Early life ==
Mehran was born in Tehran on 11 November 1977, to an accountant father and her mother Shahin was a teacher. Both practiced Iran’s Baháʼí Faith, which was considered heretical by hardline Islam. When, a year later, the Shah’s regime began to crumble, the couple began to make plans to leave. After the storming of the American embassy in Tehran upended their plan to move to the USA, the family instead migrated to Buenos Aires, Argentina, in 1979, at the time of the Iranian Revolution. Mehran grew up in Argentina and the United States, as well as lived in Australia and Ireland.

In their new home, political upheaval, this time associated with the rule of the Argentine junta, forced the family to once more move continents. This time the family moved to America, where in Miami, Mehran pursued, for a decade, her then dream of becoming a concert pianist.

Mehran's parents divorced, and in the 1990s, Mehran and her mother came to New York. Mehran told an interviewer: “I arrived in New York with only $200 in my pocket. I worked, initially, as a hostess in a restaurant owned by Russian mobsters. There were no customers there, which I thought a bit odd at first, until I realised that the restaurant was just a front for their other dealings.”

At age 17, Mehran's father reports, her permanent visa for the United States was revoked for a "minor infraction". Unhappy about having to leave the United States, Mehran moved to Australia where her parents were now living. She then moved back to the USA on a Holiday Visa when she was 19. At 21 she moved back to Australia with her then partner Christopher before jumping back and forth between Ireland, Australia and New York. She received an Artist visa from the US in 2006 and moved back to New York.

== Publications ==
Mehran's debut novel, Pomegranate Soup (2005), is the story of three sisters who escape Iran at the time of the Revolution and eventually settle in a small town in the west of Ireland, where they open the Babylon Cafe. Mehran used her own family's experiences when writing the novel, which includes a number of recipes and combines "Persian cooking with Irish living." Pomegranate Soup has been translated into 15 languages to date, and published in over 20 countries worldwide.

Her second novel, Rosewater and Soda Bread (2008), is a continuation of Pomegranate Soup. It marked the second installment of a series that was cut short by her death in April 2014. The series was to run for seven books; the third, Pistachio Rain, was due for publication in 2014.

Her posthumous novel, The Margaret Thatcher School of Beauty (2014), later titled The Saturday Night School of Beauty, is set in Buenos Aires during the Falklands War and tells the story of a group of individuals who gather once a week to recite poetry and tell tales of what has been.

== Adaptations ==
Matador Pictures optioned Pomegranate Soup in 2013 with Kirsten Sheridan slated to write and direct the film.

== Personal life ==
Mehran was married to Christopher Collins from County Mayo, Ireland. They met when he was a bartender in an Irish pub, in Manhattan, New York. They then lived in Ireland for two years. In 2013, the couple divorced.

== Death ==
Mehran was found dead in her rented house in Lecanvey, County Mayo, Ireland, on 30 April 2014, having been dead for about a week. She had lived there as a recluse and had deteriorated mentally, with the house filled with rubbish. She had suffered from long-term inflammatory bowel disease; the autopsy indicated this may have been a factor in her death, though it was not possible to identify the exact cause. Her ashes were sent for resting in Melbourne.
