= James Berry (writer) =

Irish writer

- Born: 1842; Bunowen, Louisburgh, County Mayo, Ireland
- Died: 4 June 1914 (aged 71–72)
- Occupation: Farmer

James Berry (1842–1914) was an Irish writer and farmer.

== Early life ==
Berry born in Bunowen, Louisburgh, County Mayo. Through visiting his uncle Father Ned O'Malley, the parish priest in Carna, County Galway, he met and married Sarah Greene, a local woman. They lived together in Carna and went on to have 11 children.

== Career ==
From 1910 to 1914 Berry had a column in The Mayo News under the title Tales of the West – Recollections of my Early Boyhood (reprinted in 1927). The column centered on tales he heard during his youth growing up in Mayo and described events from the Famine years such as the Doolough Tragedy. In 1967, a collection of his stories was published as Tales of the West of Ireland by Gertrude M. Horgan of Aquinas College (Michigan). Berry's Letters to the Editor of the Connaught Telegraph were published as columns in that newspaper during the latter part of the 19th century and the early 20th century. Some of these 19th century letters advocated for the Irish peasantry and described the horrific abuses inflicted upon them by the Anglo-Irish landlord class.

== Death ==
Berry died on 4 June 1914 and was buried in Mynish cemetery, Carna.

== Selected works ==
- Tales of the West of Ireland, ed. Gertrude M. Horgan (Dublin: Dolmen Press, 1966), LCCN 67-89045; 2nd ed., 1969; 3rd ed., 1975, LCCN 76--36617, later reprinted
- Tales of Old Ireland (London: Robinson Publ.; Salem NH: Salem House, 1984) – same work issued in the Country Classics series, OCLC 12731705, OCLC 12268063

== Sources ==
- Memories of My Father by Helena Berry, An Coinneal, Louisburgh, 1963, pp. 67–68
- Connemara: A Little Gaelic Kingdom, Tim Robinson, 2011
