= Inishgort =

Island in County Mayo, Ireland

Coordinates: 53°35′50″N 10°15′47″W

Inishgort (Gaeilge: Inis Goirt) is an island in Clew Bay, County Mayo. Inishgort is home to Inishgort lighthouse, originally opened in 1806.

== Demographics ==
Historical population

Year	Pop.	±%
1841	32	—
1851	20	−37.5%
1861	30	+50.0%
1871	35	+16.7%
1881	23	−34.3%
1891	12	−47.8%
1901	9	−25.0%
1911	7	−22.2%

Year	Pop.	±%
1926	0	−100.0%
1936	12	—
1946	12	+0.0%
1951	9	−25.0%
1956	7	−22.2%
1961	6	−14.3%
1966	6	+0.0%
1971	8	+33.3%

Year	Pop.	±%
1979	3	−62.5%
1981	3	+0.0%
1986	3	+0.0%
1991	2	−33.3%
1996	2	+0.0%
2002	1	−50.0%
2006	1	+0.0%

Source: Central Statistics Office. "CNA17: Population by Off Shore Island, Sex and Year". CSO.ie.
