= Eochu Buadach =

Eochu Buadach, son of Dui Ladrach, was, according to some redactions or versions of Lebor Gabála Érenn, a High King of Ireland. However, he is not included as a High King in other versions of the story. He was the father of two High Kings of Ireland, Ugaine Mor, and Bodbchad.

== Storyline variation ==
According to the R. A. Stewart Macalister translation of Lebor Gabála Érenn, part 5, page 265, its says;

Thereafter the princedom of Ulaid was sundered from Temair, and
Eochu Buadach s. Dui took the kingship of Ireland—the father of Ugoine
Mór, who was foster-son to Cimbaeth s. Finntan.

Macalister says that it is an abstract from the Roll of the Kings from Oengus Olmucach to Cimbáeth, appended to the Second Redaction (R²). Macalister describes the text as an Emain Macha interpolation. However, Macalister does not include Eochu Buadach as a High King in his main List of High Kings of Ireland.

If Eochu Buadach was a High King of Ireland for any period of time, his reign would have been near the end of the reign of Cimbáeth, and his reign ended in 661 BC, according to the Annals of the Four Masters timeline.
