= Clew Bay Heritage Centre =

- Ionad Oidhreachta Chuan Mó
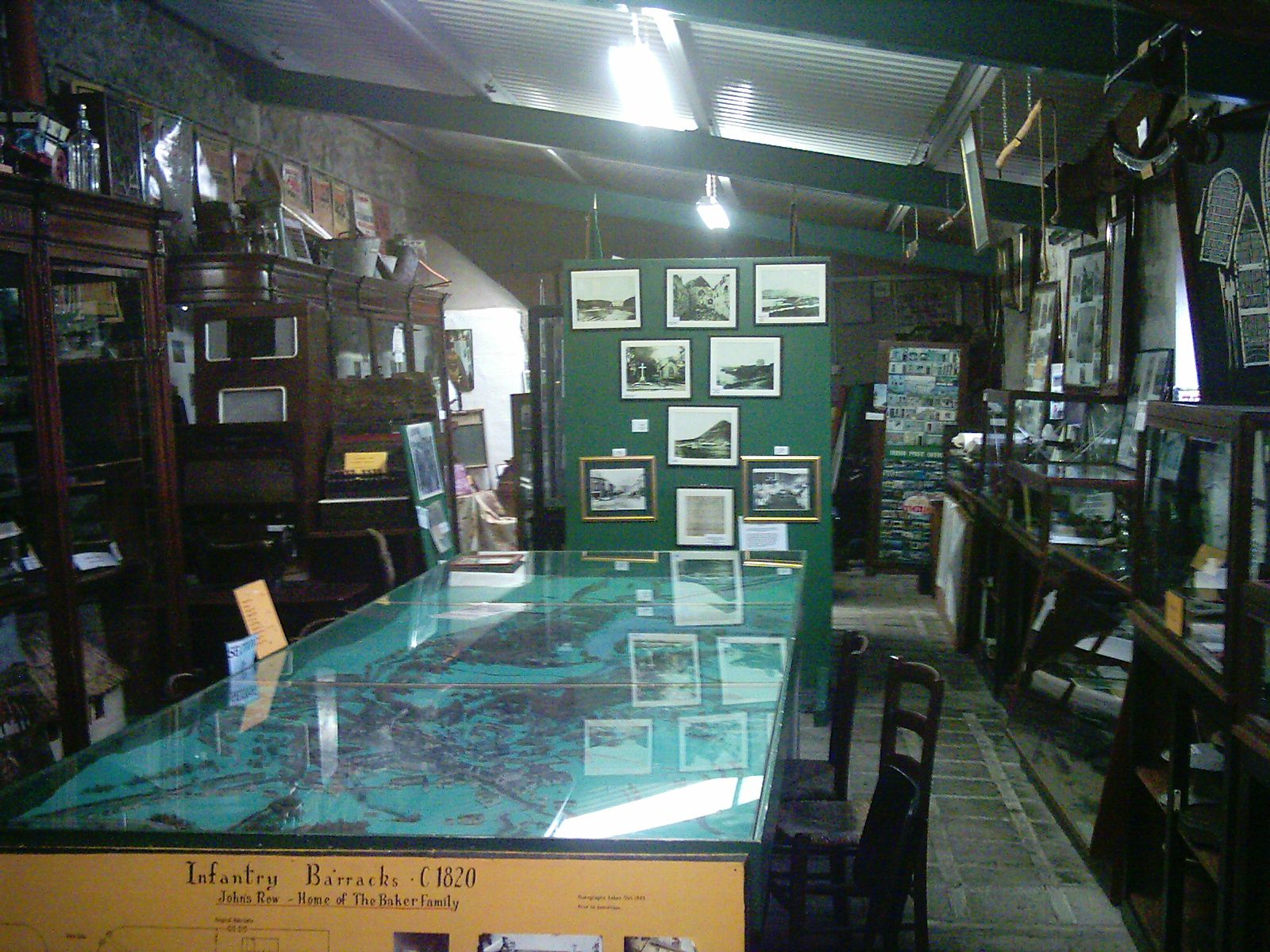
- Museum interior

- Location within Ireland
- Established: 1987
- Location: The Quay, Westport, County Mayo, Ireland
- Coordinates: 53.802°N 9.554846°W
- Type: local history museum
- Founders: Brian Mannion, Jarlath Duffy
- Owner: Clew Bay Heritage Centre Ltd
- Public transit access: Westport railway station (3.2 km); Westport (Mill Street) bus stop (2.5 km)
- Parking: On-site
- Website: westportheritage.com

Clew Bay Heritage Centre is a local history museum in Westport, County Mayo, Ireland. Located in the west of the town, on the pier, it illustrates the social history and heritage of the Clew Bay area and Westport. Topics covered include Croagh Patrick, Grace O'Malley, John MacBride, Maud Gonne, the Irish War of Independence, the 1798 Rebellion and schooling in the area.

The museum is located in a 19th-century stone building, once used for holding live pigs prior to transport, donated by the Harbour Board. It was founded by Westport Historical Society in 1987. Tour guides describe it as "a chaotic but engaging jumble" and "a veritable garage sale of history."
