= Rechtaid Rígderg =

Rechtaid Rígderg ("red king"), son of Lugaid Laigdech, was, according to medieval Irish legend and historical tradition, a High King of Ireland. He took power after killing Macha Mong Ruad, daughter of his father's killer, Áed Rúad. He ruled for twenty years, until he was killed by Úgaine Mór, foster-son of Macha and her husband Cimbáeth. The Lebor Gabála Érenn synchronises his reign to that of Ptolemy I Soter (323–283 BC). The chronology of Geoffrey Keating's Foras Feasa ar Éirinn dates his reign to 461–441 BC, the Annals of the Four Masters to 654–634 BC.

If a son of the legendary 2nd century AD Lugaid Loígde, Rechtaid Rígderg appears to have been misplaced chronologically by the later medieval synchronists.

Preceded by Macha Mong Ruad	High King of Ireland; LGE 4th/3rd century BC; FFE 461–441 BC; AFM 654–634 BC	Succeeded by Úgaine Mór
