= Murrisk =

Village near Croagh Patrick, Ireland

Murrisk Muraisc
- Village and district
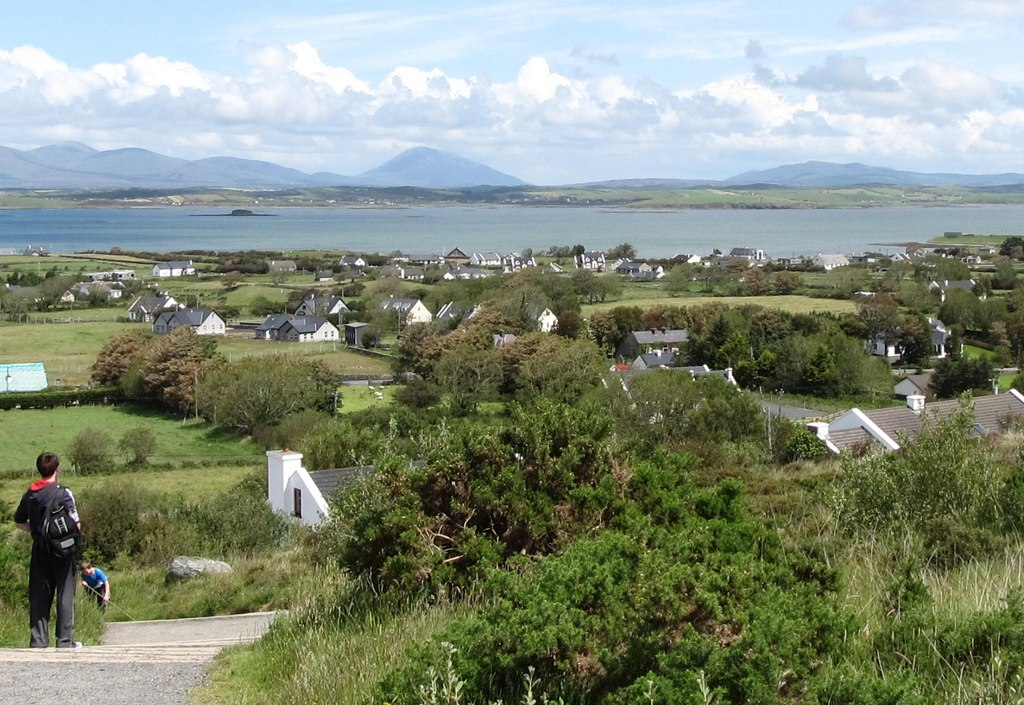

- Location in Ireland
- Coordinates: 53°46′42″N 9°37′53″W
- Country: Ireland
- Province: Connacht
- County: County Mayo
- Elevation: 70 m (230 ft)

Population (2016)
  - Total: 266 (approx)
- (Reflects the small area which partially surrounds Murrisk)
- Time zone: UTC+0 (WET)
  - Summer (DST): UTC-1 (IST (WEST))
- Irish Grid Reference: L925821

Murrisk (Irish: Muraisc, meaning 'sea marsh') is a village in County Mayo, Ireland, on the south side of Clew Bay, about 8 km west of Westport and 4 km east of Lecanvey.

Murrisk lies at the foot of Croagh Patrick and is the starting-point for pilgrims who visit the mountain. Every year, on the last Sunday of July, thousands of people converge on the village to make the pilgrimage. There is a small interpretive centre in the village, which focuses on Croagh Patrick.

The name is also used for the entire district south to the fjord of Killary Harbour. This barony of the same name runs from Westport and also includes Louisburgh and Lecanvey; there is also at least one abandoned village, Uggool, situated above Uggool Beach. The name Murrisk derives from Mag Muirisce, associated with the legendary figure Muirisc.

== Transport ==
=== Road ===
Murrisk is on the R335 road.

Bus Éireann local route 450 Louisburgh-Lecanvey-Murrisk-Westport-Achill provides several journeys in each direction daily.

=== Rail ===
The nearest train station is Westport railway station approximately 11 kilometres (6.8 mi) distant.

== Places of interest ==
The Abbey ruins, 1792

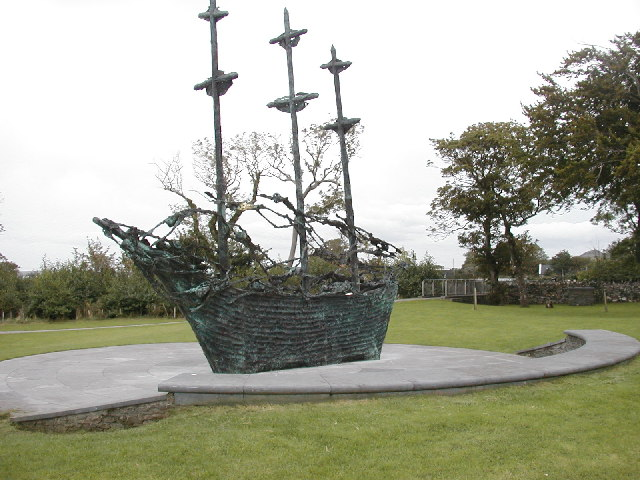
Famine Memorial

The ruined Murrisk Abbey just to the seaward side of the village was an Augustinian abbey founded in 1457 by the O'Malley family. It was suppressed in the Reformation, but survived for some time.

Murrisk is also the site of the Murrisk Millennium Peace Park, at the base of Croagh Patrick. Ireland's National Famine Memorial, which abstractly resembles a coffin ship filled with dying people, is sited within the park and was designed by Irish artist John Behan. The monument was unveiled in July 1997 by President Mary Robinson.

== Religion ==
Murrisk is part of both the Roman Catholic and Church of Ireland parishes of Oughaval. Catholic records consist of marriages (from 1825) and baptisms (from 1845), and the Church of Ireland records of baptisms, marriages and burials (all from 1802). These records are held at the South Mayo Family Research Centre in Ballinrobe which is 32 km southeast of Westport.

== See also ==
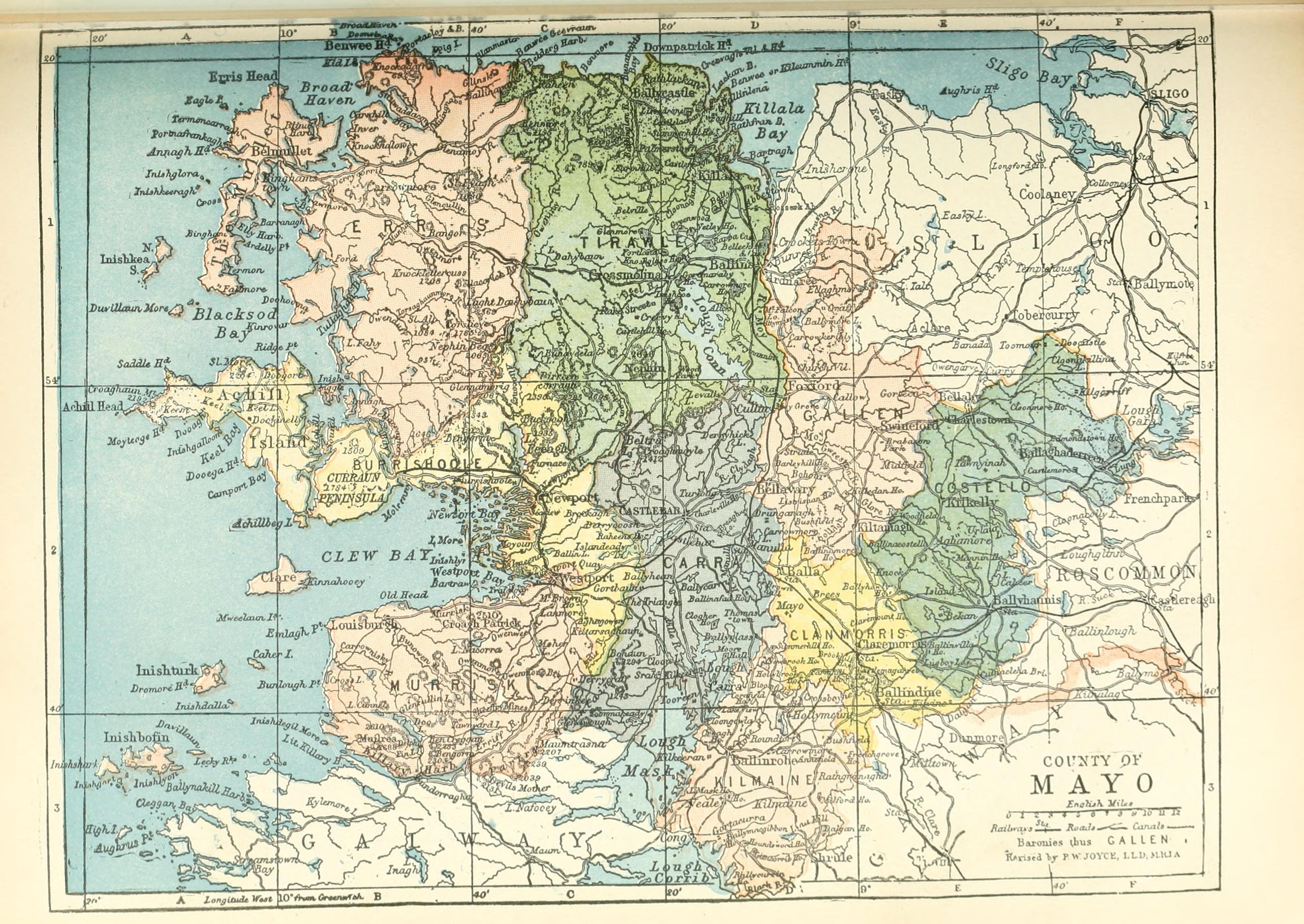
Barony of Murrisk shown in darker pink at bottom left of County Mayo

- List of towns and villages in Ireland
