= Collanmore Island =

Island in Clew Bay, Ireland

Native name: Collainn Mhó
- Location within island of Ireland

Geography
- Location: Atlantic Ocean
- Coordinates: 53°49′57″N 9°38′06″W

Administration
- Ireland
- Province: Connacht
- County: Mayo

Demographics
- Population: 5 (2022)

Collanmore Island (from Irish: Collainn Mhór) is an island in Clew Bay, County Mayo, Ireland.

== Features ==
One of the bigger islands in the bay, Collanmore was a base of Les Glénans, a non-profit sailing school. The base taught dinghy and catamaran sailing and sail-boarding. From Collanmore there are views of Croagh Patrick and the bay. It is accessed by boat from Rosmoney pier, a few kilometres from Westport, County Mayo. In 2022 there were 5 registered inhabitants of Collanmore Island.

== Demographics ==
The table below reports data on Collanmore's population taken from Discover the Islands of Ireland (Alex Ritsema, Collins Press, 1999) and the Census of Ireland.

Historical population

Year	Pop.	±%
1841	213	—
1851	215	+0.9%
1861	63	−70.7%
1871	53	−15.9%
1881	59	+11.3%
1891	69	+16.9%
1901	59	−14.5%
1911	39	−33.9%
1926	21	−46.2%

Year	Pop.	±%
1936	25	+19.0%
1946	17	−32.0%
1951	19	+11.8%
1956	15	−21.1%
1961	6	−60.0%
1966	0	−100.0%
1971	0	0.00%
1979	0	0.00%
1981	0	0.00%

Year	Pop.	±%
1986	0	0.00%
1991	5	—
1996	0	−100.0%
2002	3	—
2006	18	+500.0%
2011	4	−77.8%
2016	7	+75.0%
2022	5	−28.6%

Source: Central Statistics Office. "CNA17: Population by Off Shore Island, Sex and Year". CSO.ie.
