= St Mullin's Monastic Site =

Early medieval monastic site in Ireland

Coordinates: 52.4887°N 6.9276°W

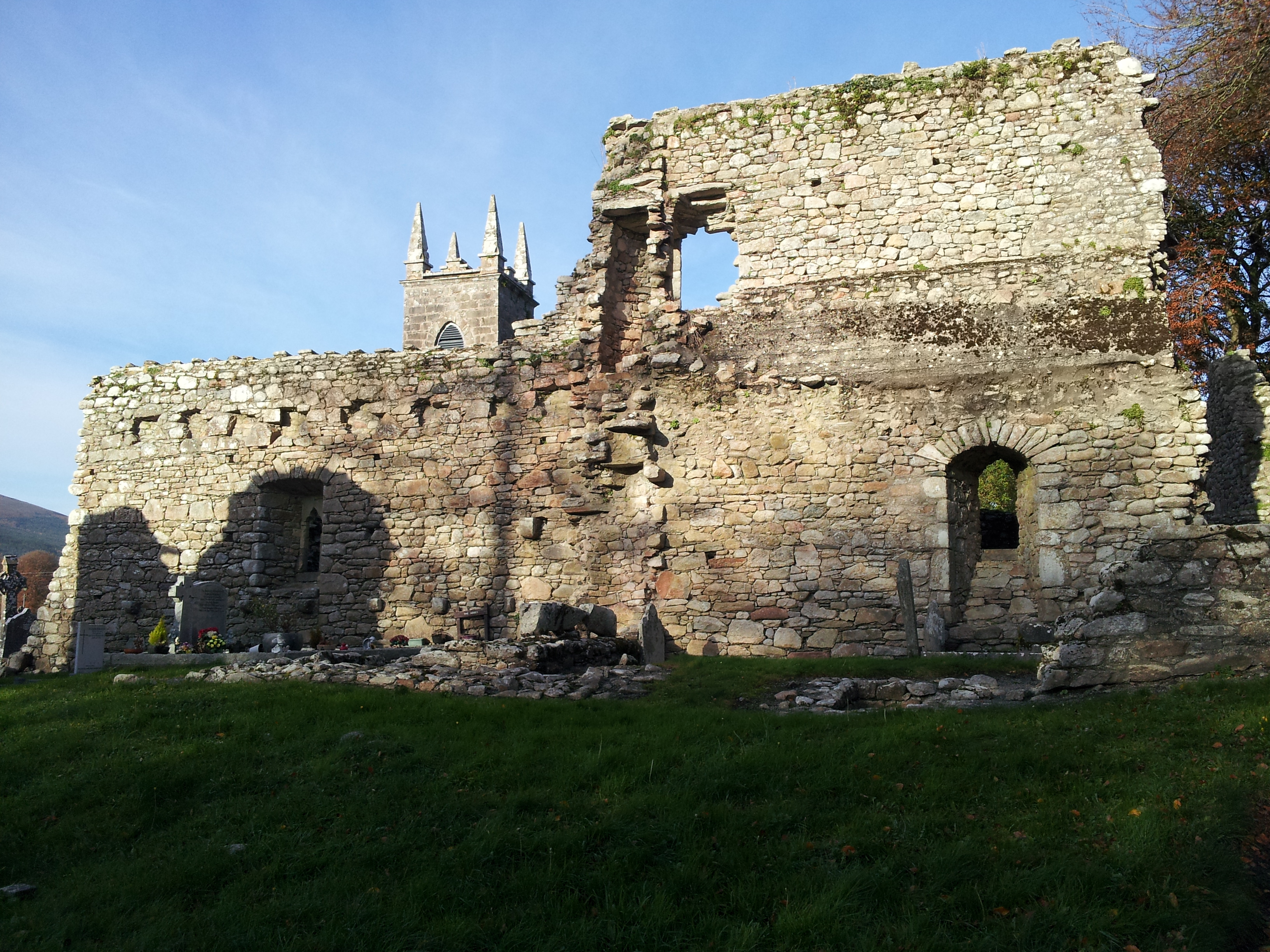

National monument of Ireland
- Official name: St Mullin's
- Reference no.: 3

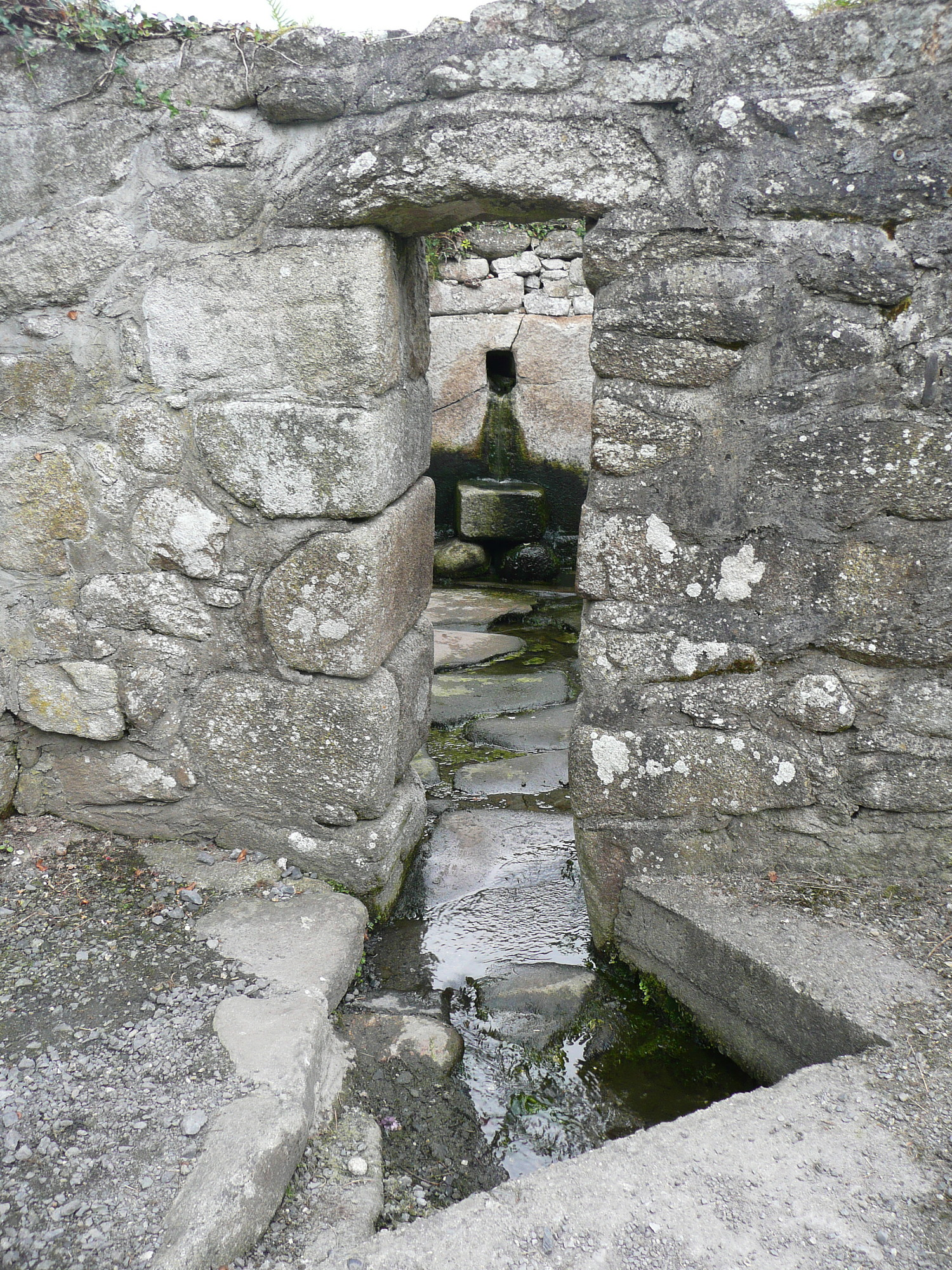
St Mullin's Well

The monastic site in St Mullin's, County Carlow, Ireland, is an early medieval ecclesiastical site.

== History ==
St Mullin's is located on the banks of the River Barrow, at the point where its tributary, the River Aughavaud meets it. The monastic site was found by Saint Moling at some point in the 7th century. It was renowned as a place of pilgrimage potentially since the pre-Christian period, when people may have traveled to the site to celebrate Lughnasadh. St Mullin's is traditionally associated with the Book of Mulling. In the early ninth century the monastery was plundered by vikings. In 1158, St Mullin's was granted to Ferns Abbey, part of the Augustinian order. In 1880, the ruins of the monastic site entered state care.

== Buildings ==
A disused Anglican church is the northernmost building on the grounds, and was built in 1811. Across the water is located St. Moling's well. The well is a rectangular stone house through which water passes.
