= Lathar =

Lathar was a daughter of Úgaine Mór, a High King of Ireland during pre-Christian times. Ugaine reputedly gave Lathar a stretch of land along the coast of County Antrim, from Glenarm to the Inver; which would one day make Larne.
