= Labhraidh Loingseach =

Labraid Loingsech (English: the exile, mariner), also known as Labraid Lorc, son of Ailill Áine, son of Lóegaire Lorc, was, according to medieval Irish legend and historical tradition, a High King of Ireland. He was an ancestor of the Laigin, who gave their name to the province of Leinster. An early dynastic poem calls him "a god among the gods", suggesting he may once have been an ancestor-deity of the Laigin.

== Childhood ==
According to tradition, his grandfather, Lóegaire Lorc, had been High King, but was treacherously killed by his brother Cobthach Cóel Breg. Cobthach also paid someone to poison Lóegaire's son, Ailill Áine, who had taken the kingship of Leinster, and forced Ailill's young son to eat a portion of his father and grandfather's hearts, and to swallow a mouse. Struck dumb by the trauma, the boy became known as Móen Ollom, "the mute scholar". Later, he was hit on the shin during a game of hurling, and cried out "I am hurt!" From then on he was called Labraid, "he speaks".

== Exile and return ==
According to the Lebor Gabála Érenn, Labraid was exiled overseas, and after thirty years made peace with Cobthach and was given the province of Leinster. Various versions of the story of Labraid's exile are told. In one, a prose tale in the Book of Leinster, Cobthach held an assembly in Tara, and asked who the most generous man in Ireland is. His poet, Ferchertne, and harper, Craiftine, immediately answered "Labraid", so Cobthach exiled the three of them from his court. They took refuge with Scoriath, king of the Fir Morca in Munster. Scoriath had a daughter, Moriath, who fell in love with Labraid, but her mother always slept with one eye open to keep an eye on her. Craiftine played a slumber-strain on his harp to put her completely to sleep, and Labraid spent the night with Moriath. When her mother woke up, she realised what has happened, Labraid confessed and the pair are married. With the help of Scoriath's army and Craiftine's harp, Labraid invades Leinster, and made peace with Cobthach.

Geoffrey Keating tells a different story. After spending some time with Scoriath in Munster, Labraid goes to the continent, where he gains great fame as the leader of the bodyguard of the king of France, who is related to Labraid's grandmother, Cessair Chrothach (who was the daughter of a king of the Franks according to the Lebor Gabála). Moriath, hearing of his great deeds, falls in love with him from a distance. She writes a love song for him, and sends Craiftine to Gaul to sing it to him. Labraid is delighted with the song, and decides to return to Ireland and reclaim his territory. The king of France equips him with ships and 2,200 men. His followers are known as Laigin after the broad blue-grey iron spearheads (láigne) they use. T. F. O'Rahilly attempted to explain the confusion over the location of Labraid's exile by suggesting that the name Fir Morca, a people located in Munster in the Book of Leinster account, was a corruption of Armorica in north-west France.

The peace between Labraid and Cobthach broke down. The Lebor Gabála says there was war between them. In the tale in the Book of Leinster, Labraid invites Cobthach, along with thirty kings of Ireland, to visit him, and builds an iron house at Dind Ríg to receive them, which takes a year to build. Cobthach refuses to enter the house unless Labraid's mother and jester go in first. They do so. Labraid serves his guests food and ale, and chains the house shut. With the aid of 150 pairs of bellows, he burns the house down, and Cobthach and 700 of his men, along with Labraid's mother and jester, are roasted to death. The jester had been promised that his family would be freed, and Labraid's mother was happy to die for the sake of her son's honour.

== Labraid's horse's ears ==
The story is told, similar to a legend of the Greek king Midas, that Labraid had horse's ears, something he tried to keep a secret. He had his hair cut once a year, and the barber, chosen by lot, would immediately be put to death. A widow, hearing that her only son had been chosen to cut the king's hair, begged the king not to kill him, and he agreed, so long as the barber kept his secret. The burden of the secret was so heavy that the barber fell ill. A druid advised him to go to a crossroads and tell his secret to the first tree he came to, and he would be relieved of his burden and be well again. He told the secret to a large willow. Soon after this, however, Craiftine broke his harp, and made a new one out of the very willow the barber had told his secret to. Whenever he played it, the harp sang "Labraid Lorc has horse's ears". Labraid repented of all the barbers he had put to death and admitted his secret.

In the oral folklore surrounding St Brigid, there is a tale of a King of Leinster who always wore his hair long to hide his ears, which were those of an ass. The afflicted king sent word to St Brigid, who came to him and told him to sit in a chair and place his head in her lap. When she rubbed his ears, they immediately became short again. Although the Leinster king is not named, the details of the story share common themes with the story of Labraid Lorc.

The Czech poem Král Lávra (King Lavra) by Karel Havlíček Borovský is inspired by this legend.

== Reign ==
He ruled for ten, nineteen or thirty years, depending on the source consulted, and took vengeance on Cobthach's children, before being killed by Cobthach's son Meilge Molbthach. The Lebor Gabála dates Cobthach's death and Labraid's accession to Christmas Eve, 307 BC, and also synchronises his reign to that of Ptolemy III Euergetes (246–222 BC). The chronology of Keating's Foras Feasa ar Éirinn dates his reign to 379–369 BC, the Annals of the Four Masters to 542–523 BC.

Preceded by Cobthach Cóel Breg	High King of Ireland; LGE^{1} 3rd century BC; LGE^{2} 307–288 BC; FFE 379–369 BC; AFM 542–523 BC	Succeeded by Meilge Molbthach

== See also ==
- Midas
