= Bodbchad =

High King of Ireland

Badbchaid, son of Eochu Buadach, son of Dui Ladrach, was, according to late sources, briefly a High King of Ireland. The Lebor Gabála Érenn says Bodbchad murdered his brother, the High King Úgaine Mór, who was succeeded directly by his son Lóegaire Lorc. However, Geoffrey Keating and the Annals of the Four Masters agree that, after killing Úgaine, Bodbchad took the throne for a day and a half, after which Lóegaire killed him. The Lebor Gabála synchronises Úgaine's reign to that of Ptolemy II Philadelphus (281–246 BC). The chronology of Keating's Foras Feasa ar Éirinn dates Bodbchad's reign to 411 BC, that of the Annals of the Four Masters to 594 BC.

| Preceded by Úgaine Mór | High King of Ireland; LGE 3rd century BC; FFE 411 BC; AFM 594 BC | Succeeded by Lóegaire Lorc |
