= Lóegaire Lorc =

Lóegaire Lorc, son of Úgaine Mor, was, according to medieval Irish legend and historical tradition, a High King of Ireland. The Lebor Gabála Érenn says he succeeded directly after his father was murdered by Bodbchad, although Geoffrey Keating and the Annals of the Four Masters agree that Bodbchad seized power for a day and a half before Lóegaire killed him. He ruled for two years. His brother Cobthach Cóel Breg coveted the throne, and, taking the advice of a druid, pretended to be sick so Lóegaire would visit him. When he arrived, Cobthach feigned death, and when Lóegaire was bent over his body in mourning, stabbed him in with a dagger. Cobthach then paid someone to poison Lóegaire's son Ailill Áine, and forced Ailill's son Labraid to eat his father's and grandfather's hearts and a mouse, before forcing him into exile, supposedly because it was said that Labraid was the most hospitable man in Ireland. The Lebor Gabála synchronises his reign to that of Ptolemy II Philadelphus (281–246 BC). The chronology of Keating's Foras Feasa ar Éirinn dates Bodbchad's reign to 411–409 BC, that of the Annals of the Four Masters to 594–592 BC.

Preceded by Úgaine Mór or Badbchaid	High King of Ireland; LGE 3rd century BC; FFE 411–409 BC; AFM 594–592 BC	Succeeded by Cobthach Cóel Breg
