= Cobthach Cóel Breg =

Cobthach Cóel Breg or Cobthach Fion, son of Úgaine Mor, was, according to medieval Irish legend and historical tradition, a High King of Ireland. He took power after murdering his brother Lóegaire Lorc. The story is told that he was so consumed with jealousy for his brother that he wasted away to almost nothing, from which he gained his epithet Cóel Breg, the "meagre of Brega". Acting on advice from a druid, he sent word to that he was ill, so that Lóegaire would visit him. When he arrived, he pretended to be dead. As he lay on his bier, Lóegaire prostrated himself over his body in grief, and Cobthach stabbed him with a dagger. He paid someone to poison Lóegaire's son, Ailill Áine, and forced Ailill's son Labraid to eat part of his father's and grandfather's hearts, and a mouse, and forced him into exile – according to one version, because it had been said that Labraid was the most hospitable man in Ireland. Cobthach later made peace with Labraid, now known by the epithet Loingsech, "the exile", and gave him the province of Leinster, but relations broke down again and war broke out between them, and Labraid burned Cobthach and his followers to death in an iron house at Dind Ríg, marking a rift in the house of Erimon. He had ruled for either fifty or thirty years. The Lebor Gabála gives fifty, and dates his death to Christmas Eve, 307 BC. It also synchronises his reign with that of Ptolemy II Philadelphus (281–246 BC). The chronology of Keating's Foras Feasa ar Éirinn dates his reign to 409–379 BC, that of the Annals of the Four Masters to 592–542 BC.

Preceded by Lóegaire Lorc	High King of Ireland; LGE^{1} 3rd century BC; LGE^{2} 357–307 BC; FFE 409–379 BC; AFM 592–542 BC	Succeeded by Labraid Loingsech
