= Clew Bay =

Ocean bay in County Mayo, Ireland

- Cuan Mó (Irish)
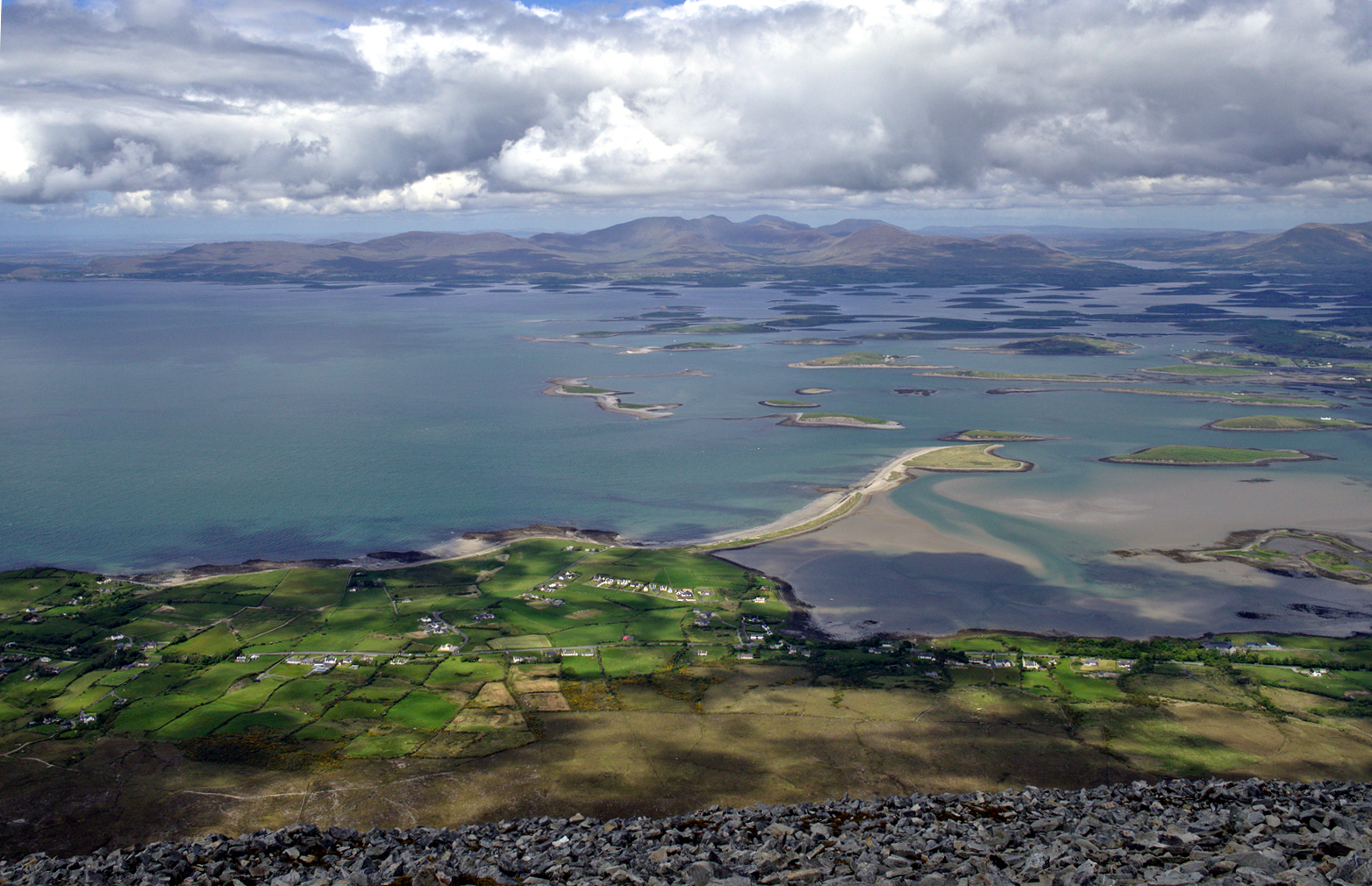
- Clew Bay from the south

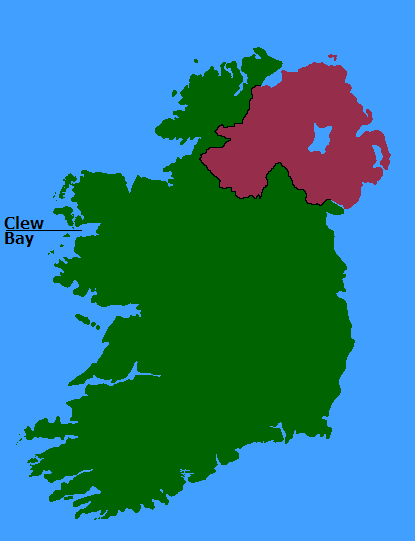
- Location: County Mayo
- Coordinates: 53°50′N 9°48′W
- Etymology: English name: "bay of hurdles" Irish name: "Modh's harbour"
- River sources: Bunowen river network, Owenmore river network, Newport river network, Srahmore river, Carrowbeg River, Moyour River, Owenglasbreen Stream, Owenwee River, Owennabrockagh river, Rossow river
- Ocean/sea sources: Atlantic Ocean
- Basin countries: Ireland
- Islands: Clare Island, Dorinish
- Settlements: Louisburgh, Lecanvey, Murrisk, Westport, Newport, Mulranny

Clew Bay (/ˈkluː/; Irish: Cuan Mó) is a large ocean bay on the Atlantic coast of County Mayo, Ireland. It is roughly rectangular and has more than a hundred small islands on its landward side, Ireland's best example of sunken drumlins. The larger Clare Island guards the entrance of the bay.

The bay is overlooked by Croagh Patrick to the south and the Nephin Beg Mountains to the north. From the southwest part of the bay eastwards are the settlements Louisburgh, Lecanvey, Murrisk, and Westport; north of Westport is Newport, and westwards from there lies Mulranny, gateway to Achill.

== History ==
The bay was historically known in Irish as Cuan Mod ("harbour of Mod") or Modlind ("pool of Mod"), and was associated with the Fir Bolg. This later became Cuan Modha. Some writers claim that this name derives from Modh, one of the Tuatha Dé Danann. Another possibility is the Old Irish mod, moth, which meant "penis" or "man".

Another old name is Cuan Umhaill ("harbour of Umhaill"). It was rendered in English as "Bay of the Owly" and "Bay of the Owles." Other English names were the Bay of Borace, Horrus, and Baragh, all references to Burrishoole (Buiríos Umhaill). The name 'Clew Bay', of uncertain origin, first appears in a 1714 map; it may be derived from cliath, "hurdle".

Clew Bay was the heart of the Gaelic territory of Umhaill, ruled by the Uí Máille (O'Malleys). Umhaill's last and most famous ruler was Grace O'Malley (Gráinne Ní Mháille), nicknamed "the pirate queen". The O'Malleys had a fleet of ships and several castles around Clew Bay, including Carrickkildavnet Castle, Carrickahowley Castle and Granuaile's Castle.

During the Irish Civil War in July 1922, 400 Free State troops were landed at Clew Bay to take Westport and Castlebar from Anti-Treaty forces.

In 2024, the discovery of a submerged late Bronze Age fort from the depths of Clew Bay was announced by a team from Connemara and Mayo County Council.

== Inishgort Lighthouse ==
Inishgort Lighthouse stands on the island of Inishgort, 5 km (3.1 mi) from Murrisk.

== Fish farming in Clew Bay ==
In recent years there has been controversy over fish-farming in the bay. "The Organic Salmon Company" (now owned by Mowi) is based in Clare Island.

== Gallery ==
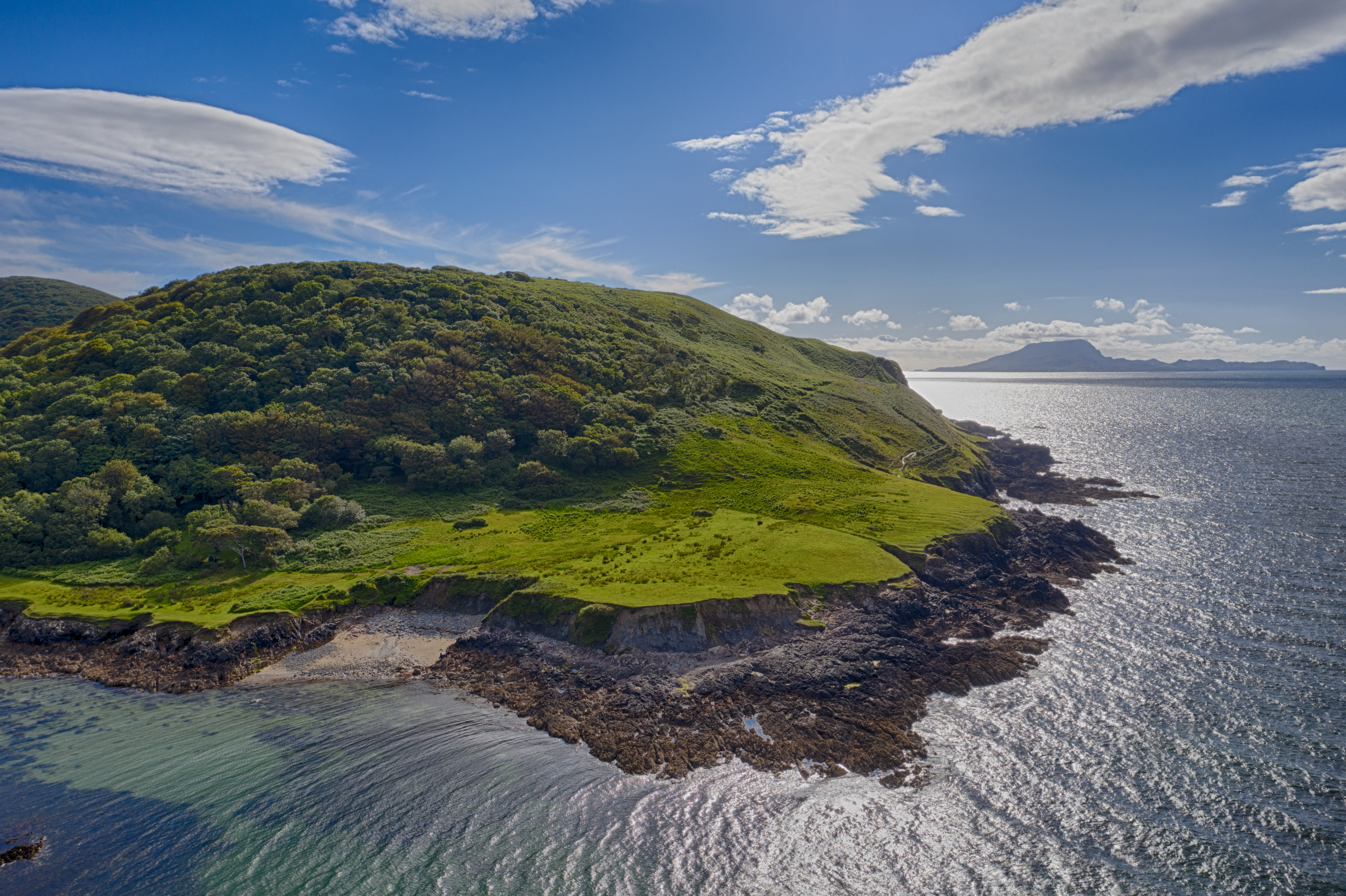
Old Head Wood Nature Reserve (southern edge of Clew Bay

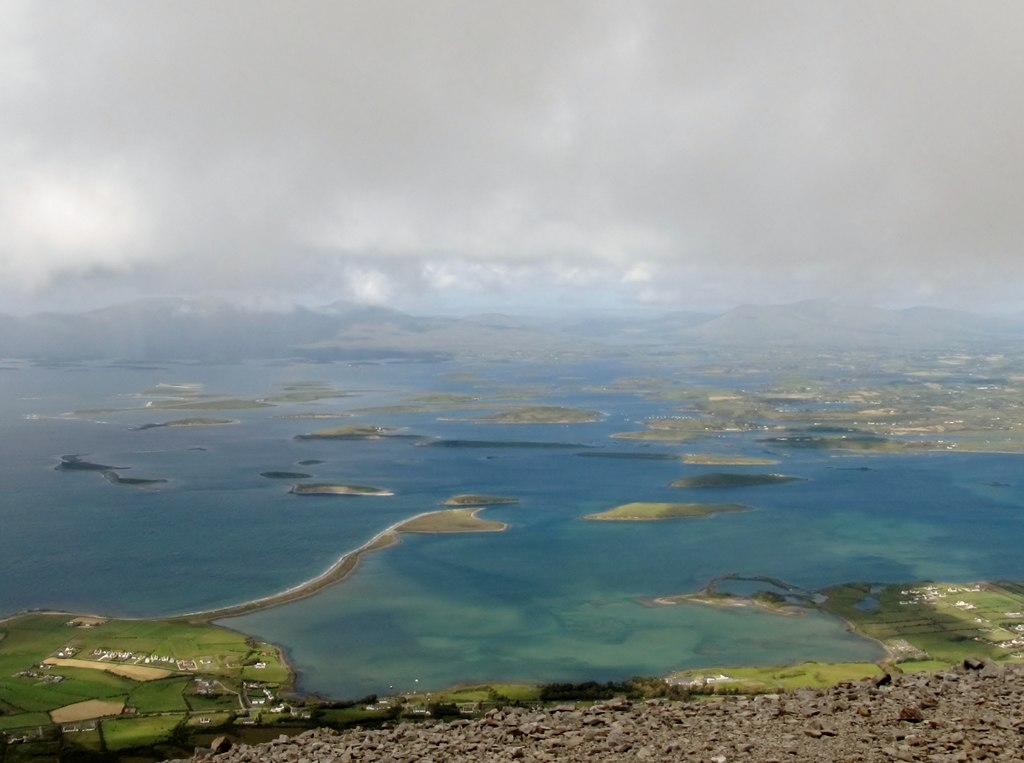
Clew Bay as seen from the top of Croagh Patrick.

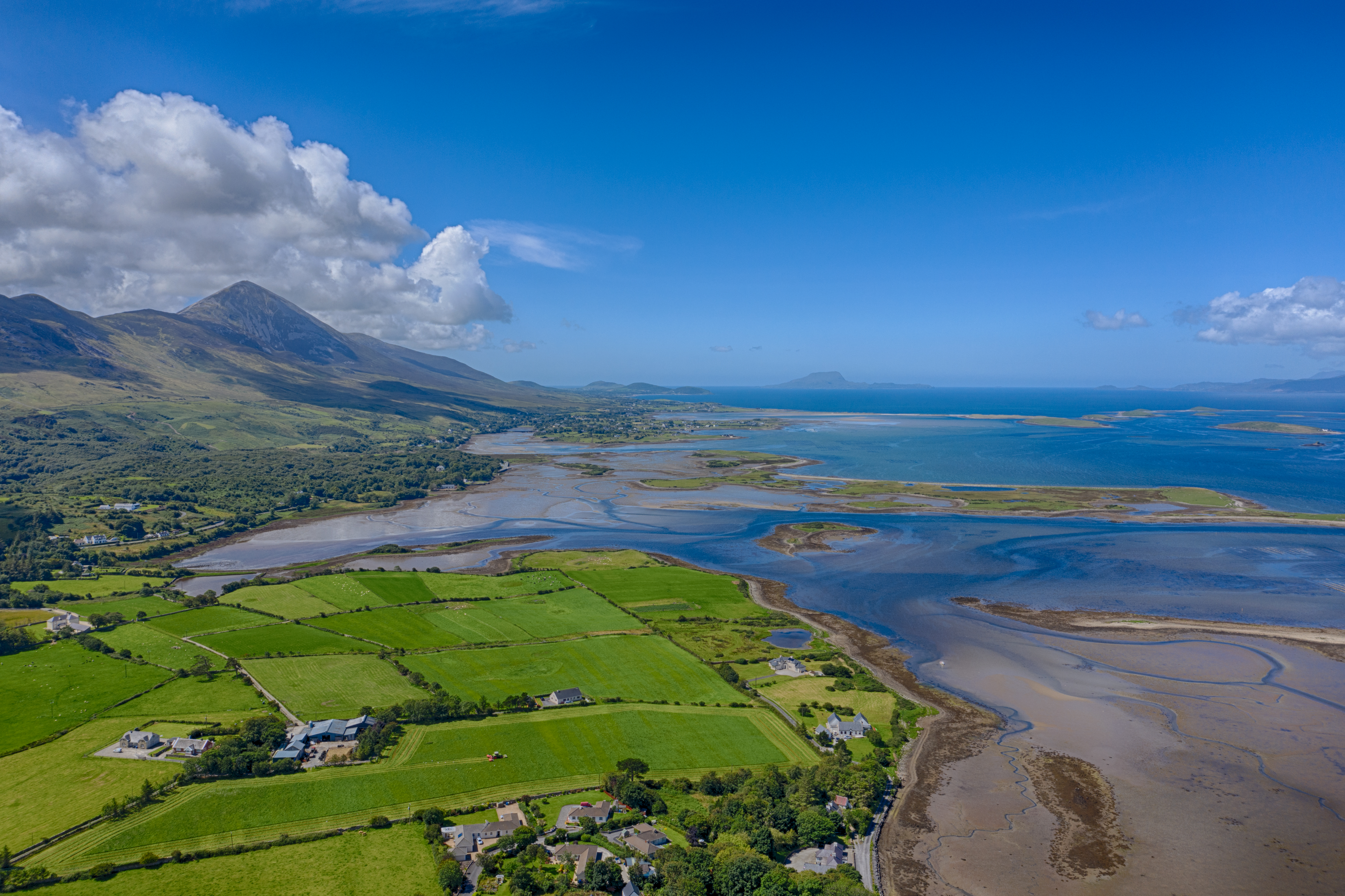
Clew Bay as seen from Westport.

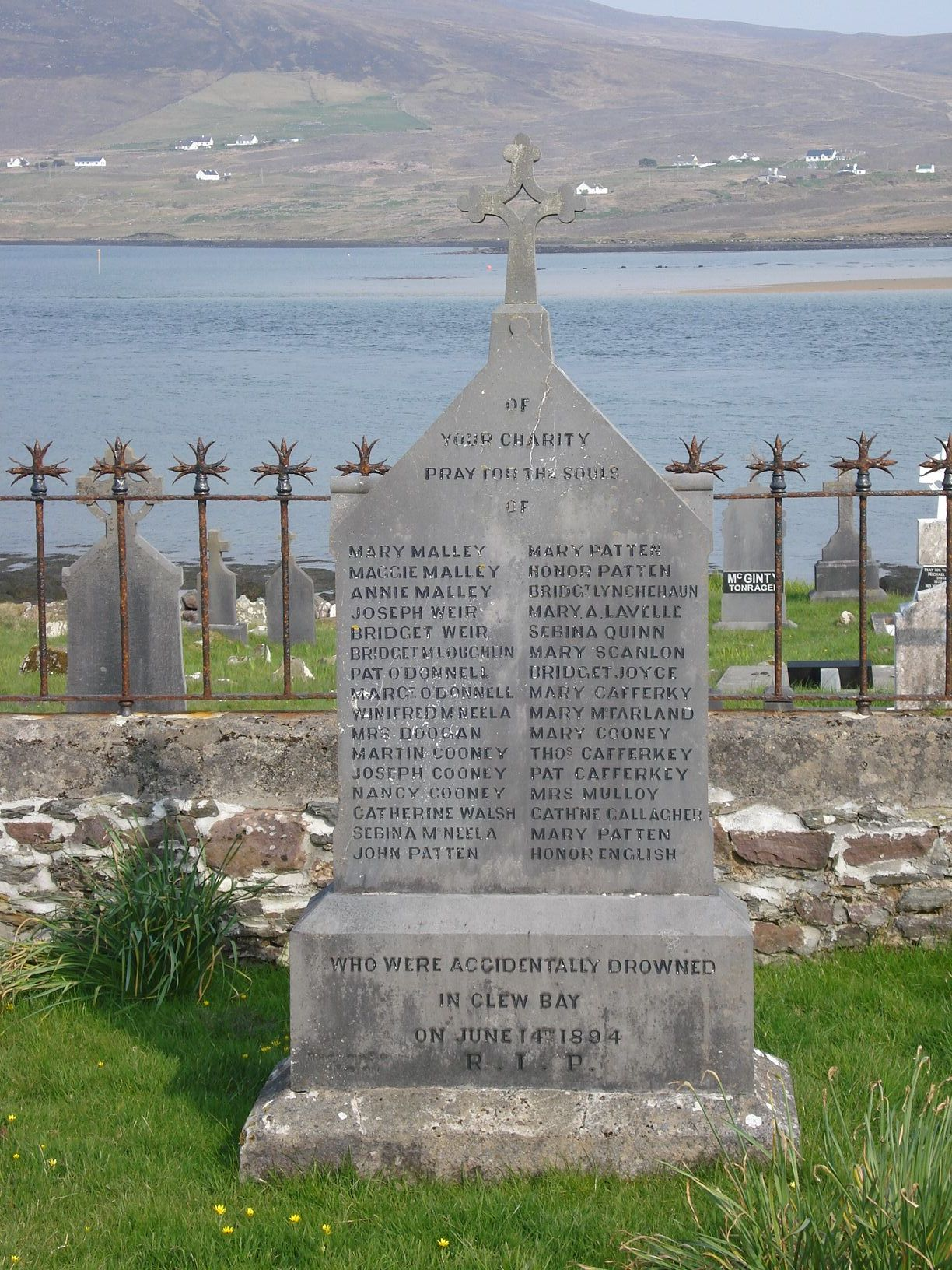
Memorial for the victims of the Clew Bay Drowning on June 14, 1894 at Kildavenet Graveyard, Achill Island

== Islands of Clew Bay ==
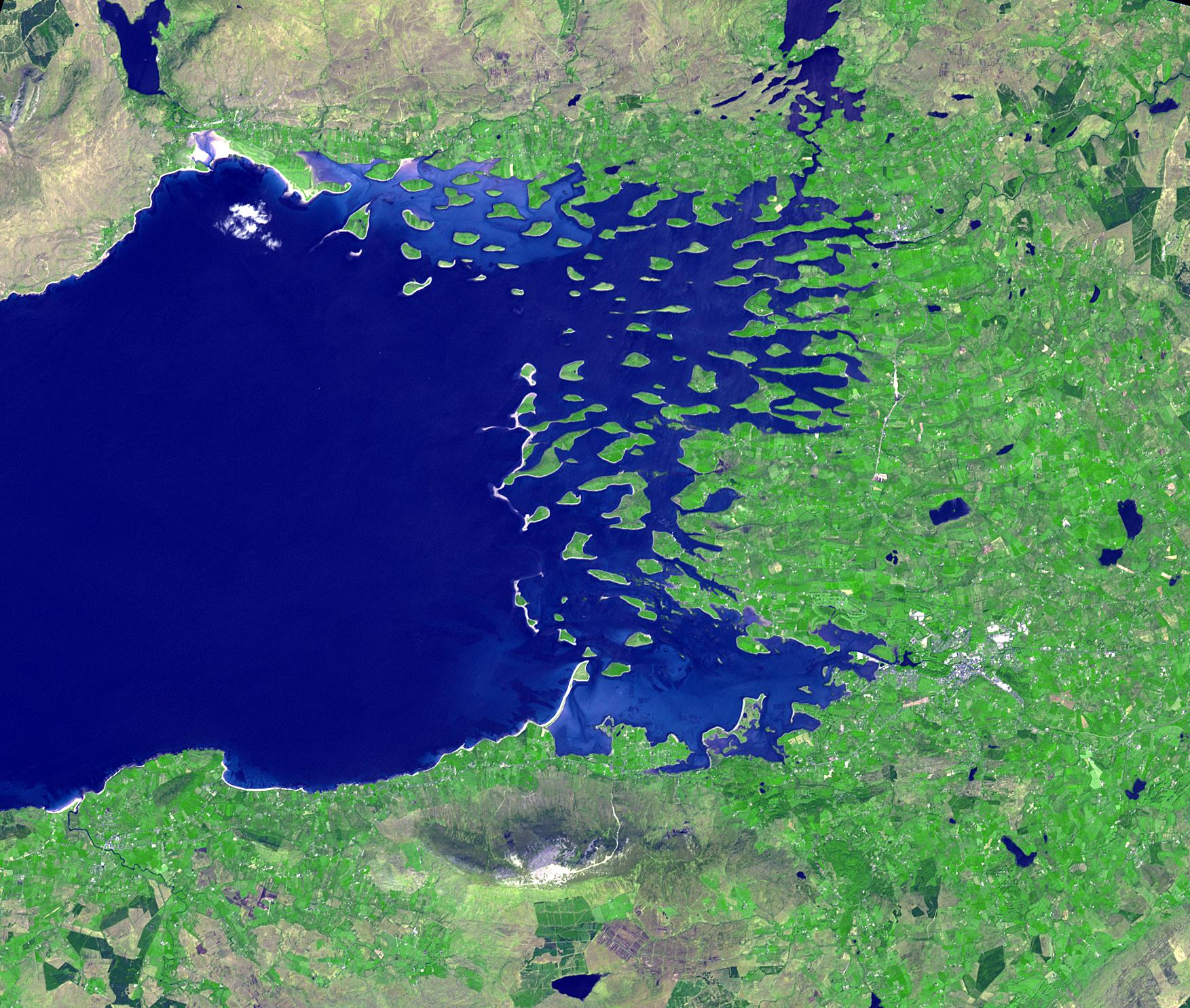
Satellite view

The bay is also home to Dorinish, a private island purchased by John Lennon in 1967. Glenans Ireland, a non-profit sailing school, had a branch on Collanmore Island where sailing was taught.

Legend has it that Clew Bay has 365 islands in it—"an island for every day of the year". The large number of drumlins at the east end of the bay gave rise to this myth, but in fact there are not so many.

=== Drumlin islands, sandbars, and rocks ===
This chart shows the relative positions of the islands, sandbars, and rocks in the eastern half of Clew Bay. There are 141 named islands and islets within the bay.

	86	87	88	89	90	91	92	93	94	95	96
96		Inishkeel	Inishbobunnan (Unnamed)	Beetle Island North; Inishlim							
95	Moynish More	Black Rock; Inisherkin	Inishgowla; Beetle Island South; Inishnacross	Inishtubrid	Inishquirk		Illannambraher	Roslynagh	Gobfadda; Kid Island East		Forillan; Illanavrick; Camel Island
94	Moynish Beg	Inishcooa; Roeillaun	Inishdeashmore; Inishdeashbeg	Inishilra; Inishcarrick; Inishcorky		Inishdasky; Inishcoragh (Unnamed)	Freaghillanluggagh	Inishdaweel; Muckinish; Illanascraw	Inishturlin	Rabbit Island	
93				Inishcannon	Inisheanmore Rock; Carrickachorra; Carricklahan	Freaghillan West; Inishkee	Freaghillan East; Inishcuill West; Inishfesh	Inishcuill; Carrickwee		Rosbarnagh Island; Carrigeennaronty	
92					Inishoo	Illanmaw; Inishgowla	Mauherillan; Inishlaughil	Inishmolt; Inishbollog	Inishdaff	Inishloy	
91					Inishbee	Calf Island; Derrinish	Inishcottle	Illannaconney; Inishnakillew	Inishturk Beg		
90					Rabbit Island	Knocky-Cahillaun; Quinnsheen Island	Freaghillan; Moneybeg Island; Clynish; Illaunnamona	Carrigeenglass North; Trawbaun; Carrigeenglass	Atticlea Island		
89					Island More	Collan Beg	Collan More; Carrigeenglass South				
88					Inishgort	Inishlyre					
87				Dorinish More	Inishlaghan	Crovinish; Carrickwee	Illanataggart; Rocky Island				
86		Creggandillisk			Dorinish Beg; Inishimmel	Inishleague	Inishgowla South; Inishraher	Forillan; Carrickawart Island; Finnaun Island	Stony Island		Cleavlagh Strand
85					Carrickataha	Bartraw; Inishdaugh	Inisheeny	Corillan; Carricknamore	Green Islands	Carricknacaly	Monkellys Rocks; Inishweela; Illanroe
84						Cahernaran Island			Annagh Island West; Sruffanbaun Strand	Annagh Island East; Illanatee	
83									Annagh Island Middle; Roeillan		

== See also ==
- Clew Bay Heritage Centre
- Wild Atlantic Way
