= Louisburgh, County Mayo =

Louisburgh Cluain Cearbán (Irish)
- Town
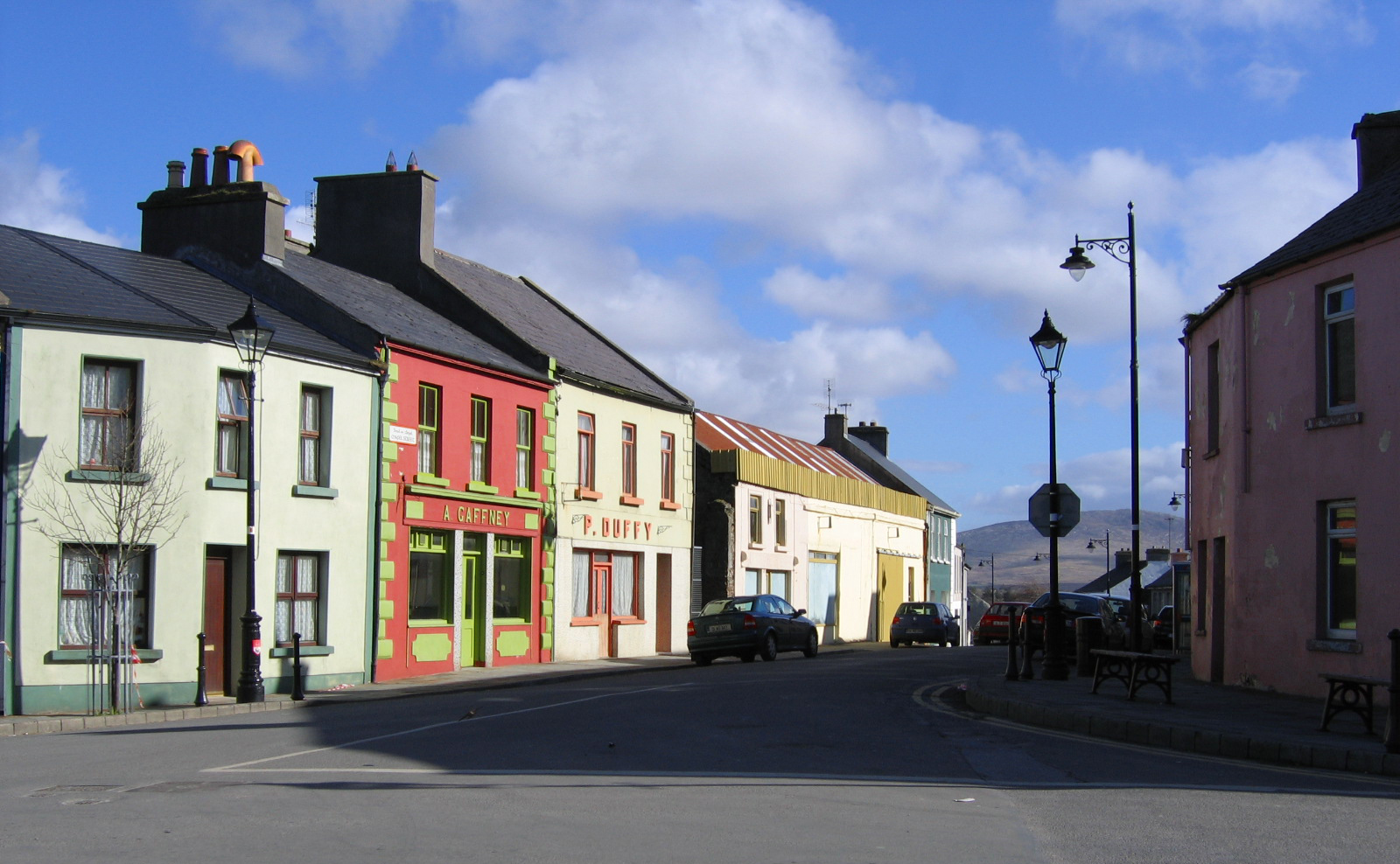
- Louisburgh town centre

- Location in Ireland
- Coordinates: 53.762°N 9.809°W
- Country: Ireland
- Province: Connacht
- County: County Mayo
- Elevation: 5 m (16 ft)

Population (2016)
  - Total: 434
- Irish Grid Reference: L803812

Louisburgh (Irish: Cluain Cearbán, meaning 'meadow of the buttercups') is a small town on the southwest corner of Clew Bay in County Mayo, Ireland. It is home to Sancta Maria College and the Gráinne O'Malley Interpretive Centre.

== History ==
Most of Louisburgh lies within the townland of Clooncarrabaun (an anglicisation of Cluain Cearbán). Evidence of ancient settlement in the area includes ringfort, enclosure and slab-lined burial sites in the neighbouring townlands of Bunowen, Caher and Carrowclaggan.

Kilgeever Abbey, located to the east of the town, was built in the 12th century on the site of an earlier early Christian church. The abbey site consists of a ruined church, a graveyard and a holy well, where pilgrimages or patterns take place.

The town of Louisburgh itself dates largely from 1795, when John Browne, 3rd Earl of Altamont of Westport (later 1st Marquess of Sligo) developed the settlement to house Catholic refugees fleeing sectarian conflict in the north of Ireland. Originally a planned town, it retains many of the 18-century features in style and scale. The 1st Marquess of Sligo named the town Louisburgh in memory of his uncle, Captain Henry Browne, who fought on the British side against the French in the Siege of Louisburg in 1758. Louisburg (or Louisbourg in French) was a French fortress on Cape Breton Island, Nova Scotia, Canada. As a result of the British victory, a temporary unit of Louisbourg Grenadiers was formed, in which his uncle was a captain.

The Church of Ireland church in Louisburgh was built in 1828 and dedicated to Saint Catherine, while the Catholic church was completed in 1861 and is dedicated to Saint Patrick.

== Geography ==
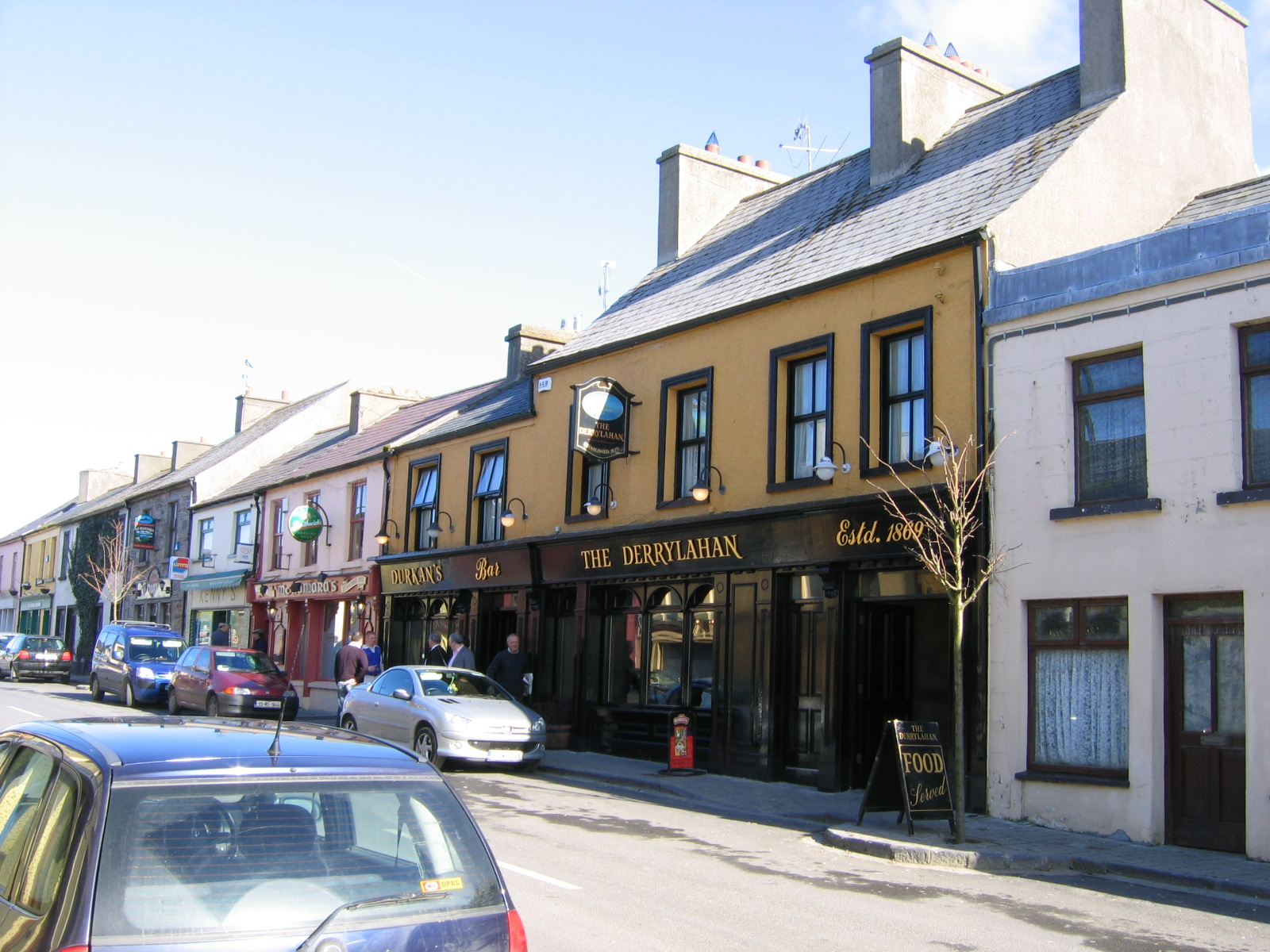
Louisburgh in 2005

Louisburgh is built on the Bunowen River, part of which is a salmon fishery. Nearby Roonagh Pier, approx 6 km from the town, is the departure point for ferries to Clare Island and Inishturk. There are a number of beaches in the area which are known for their cleanliness. Closest to the town are "majestic Old Head", Bunowen and Carramore while Carrowniskey, Cross, Lecanvey are also nearby. Further to the west and south are the beaches of White Strand of Tallabawn, Silver Strand and Uggool Beach.

The main geographical features around Louisburgh are Croagh Patrick to the east, the Sheeffry Hills and Mweelrea Mountains to the south, the Atlantic to the west and Clew Bay to the north.

== Transport ==
Louisburgh is located on the R335 regional road which connects to Westport (13 miles) and Leenane (19 miles). The approach from Westport passes along Clew Bay on one side and Croagh Patrick on the other, while the road from Leenane passes through lake and mountain scenery past Doo Lough and Delphi Lodge.

Bus Éireann local route 450 (from Dooagh to Louisburgh via Westport) provides several daily journeys in each direction.

== Culture ==
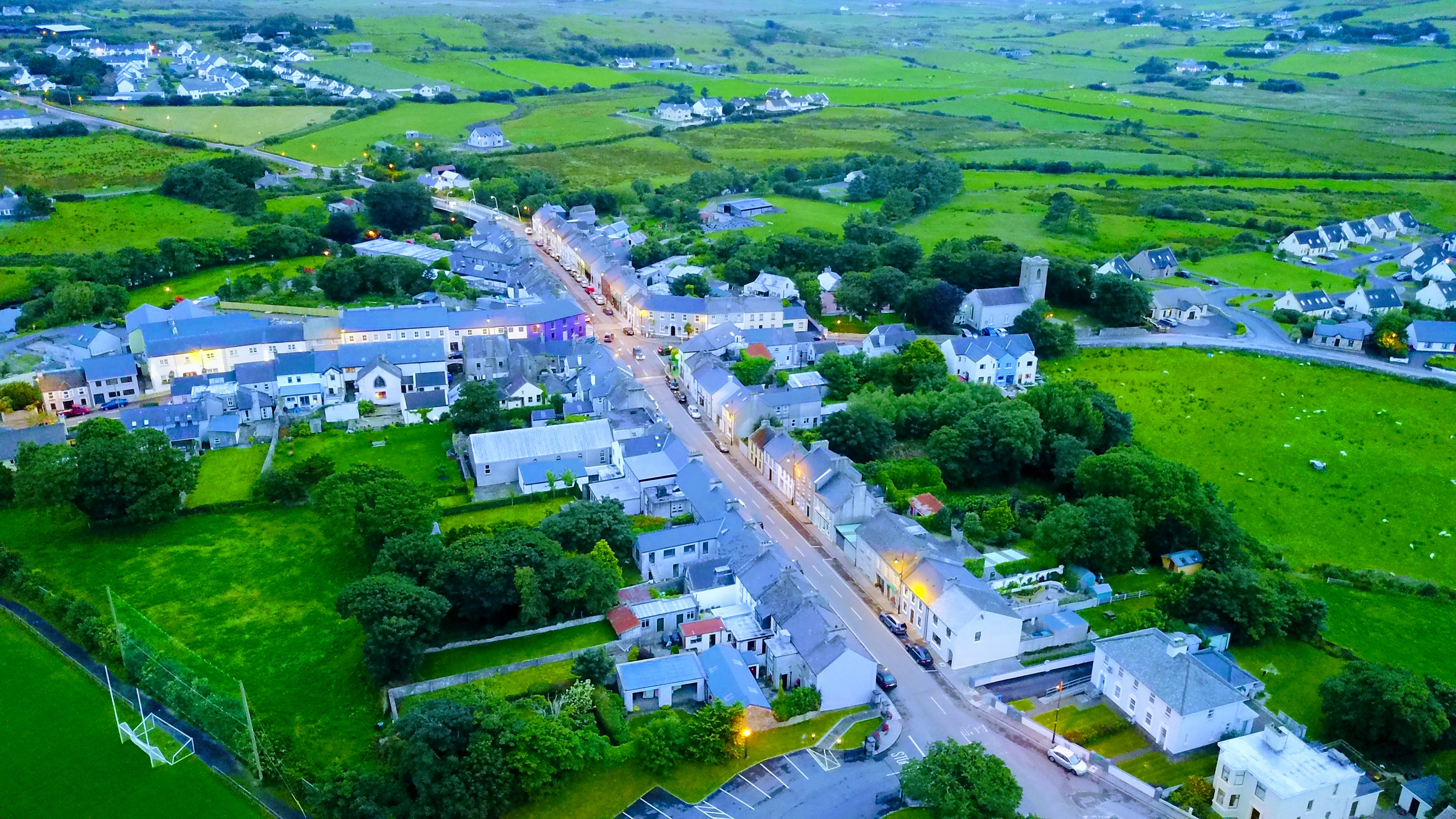
Louisburgh in the evening light, July 2017

A local amateur drama group, the Louisburgh Drama Group, was formed in 1959. Each year, on the May Bank Holiday Weekend, Louisburgh hosts a traditional music festival, Féile Chois Chuan.

== Notable people ==
- Robert Potter (1831-1908), author and theologian
- James Berry (1842–1914), writer
- John Heneghan (1881–1945), Columban missionary killed by Japanese forces during World War II in the Philippines
- Mike McCormack (born 1965), author
- John McEvilly (1818–1902), archbishop
- Austin O'Malley, Gaelic footballer
- Martin O'Toole (1925–2013), Fianna Fáil TD and senator
- Michael Viney (1933–2023), English artist and writer who moved to the area in the 1970s
