= List of islands of County Mayo =

Map of County Mayo's western seaboard

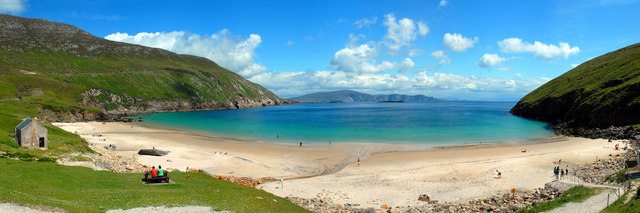
Achill is Ireland's largest island

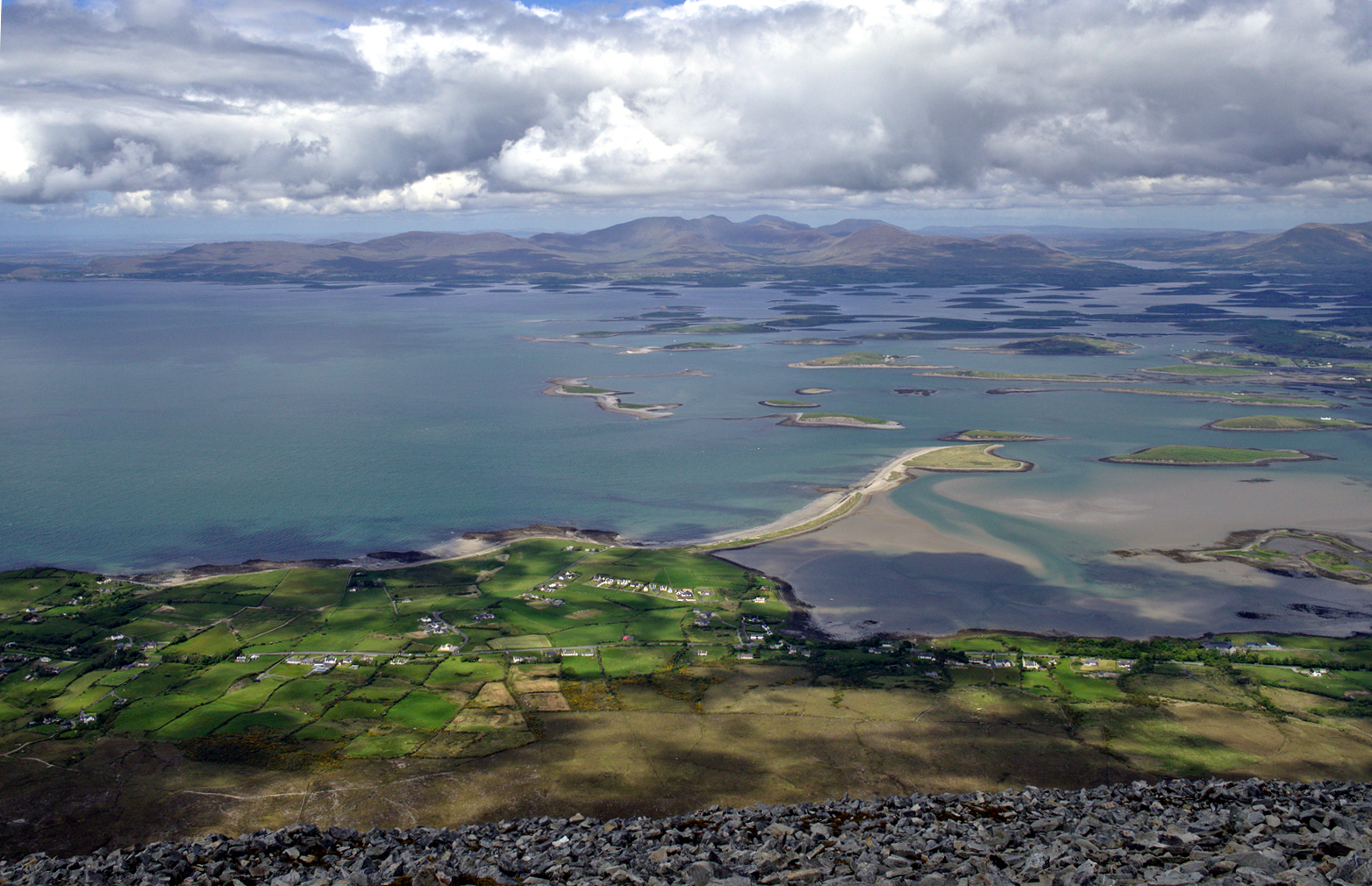
Clew Bay contains 141 named islands, along with numerous tidal islets

This articles lists the islands of County Mayo, the mainland of which is part of the island of Ireland. Included in this list are named offshore and freshwater islands as recorded by Ordnance Survey Ireland or the Placenames Database of Ireland. Additionally, areas of ecological significance related to both offshore and freshwater islands, designated by the National Parks and Wildlife Service, are also listed.

Although County Mayo has hundreds of offshore and freshwater islands, only a handful of islands and island groups are large enough to be distinguishable on a typical map of the county, namely Achill Island, Clare Island and Inishturk, along with the island clusters of Duvillaun, Inishkea, Clew Bay and the major loughs. There are over 100 islands which are greater than 10 acres (4.0 ha) in area. The largest island is Achill, which extends to 148 km^{2} (37,000 acres), making it Ireland's largest offshore island.

Due to its abundance of bays, inlets and offshore islands, Mayo is reputed to have the longest coastline of any county in Ireland, at 1,168 km (726 mi) or approximately 21% of the total coastline of the State.

The geology and geomorphology of the county and its islands is among the most varied and complex in Ireland. Islands such as those at Clew Bay are low-lying, formed when rising sea levels drowned a vast field of drumlins, while others like Clare Island and Achill are characterised by mountains and towering sea-cliffs, of which Croaghaun are the third-highest in Europe, at 688 m (2,257 ft)

The bedrock geology of the islands is broadly divided into two groups. Those north of Clew Bay such as Achill and the islands off the Mullet Peninsula are generally of ancient Dalradian age, similar to County Donegal and the Grampian Highlands. Inishglora contains some of the oldest rocks in Ireland, at 1.75 billion years old. Further south, the islands are much more diverse. Clare island alone is composed of Cambrian, Ordovician, Silurian and Carboniferous terranes sutured together. Geologically, the Clew Bay islands themselves are the youngest in the county, formed during the Lower Carboniferous about 350 million years ago.

The county's offshore islands - and islands off the west coast of Ireland generally - developed their own distinct culture and traditions stretching back centuries. Records from the 1841 Census show that 47 of County Mayo's offshore islands were inhabited, with a combined population of approximately 10,000. (Note: This refers solely to the islands contained within the present-day boundary of County Mayo. In 1841 several other islands in the area, including Inishbofin and Inishshark, were under the jurisdiction of County Mayo. These were legally transferred to County Galway in 1873 and are not included in this list.) The Great Famine resulted in widespread or total depopulation of the islands. Towards the end of the 19th century the population of the larger islands began to recover somewhat, only to be set back by emigration following independence as the Irish government initially encouraged the evacuation of the islands due to the cost of providing services to them, further hastening the decline.

Today, the islands are recognised by the State as an integral part of Ireland's national heritage, preserving the remnants of a unique aspect of Irish culture. The remaining inhabited islands receive support and funding through the Department of Culture, Heritage and the Gaeltacht. As of the 2016 Census, there are 2,700 people living on 14 of the county's offshore islands (of which 2,440 live on Achill), accounting for 1.87% of the county's population.

== Islands of Mayo by population ==
=== Demographics ===
The 2016 census records 14 offshore islands as having a usually resident population. Achill has been connected to the mainland via bridge since 1887, making Clare Island the county's most populous unconnected island, with 159 inhabitants as of 2016. This makes Clare Island the fifth-most populous unconnected island in Ireland, after the three Aran Islands off Galway and Arranmore off County Donegal.

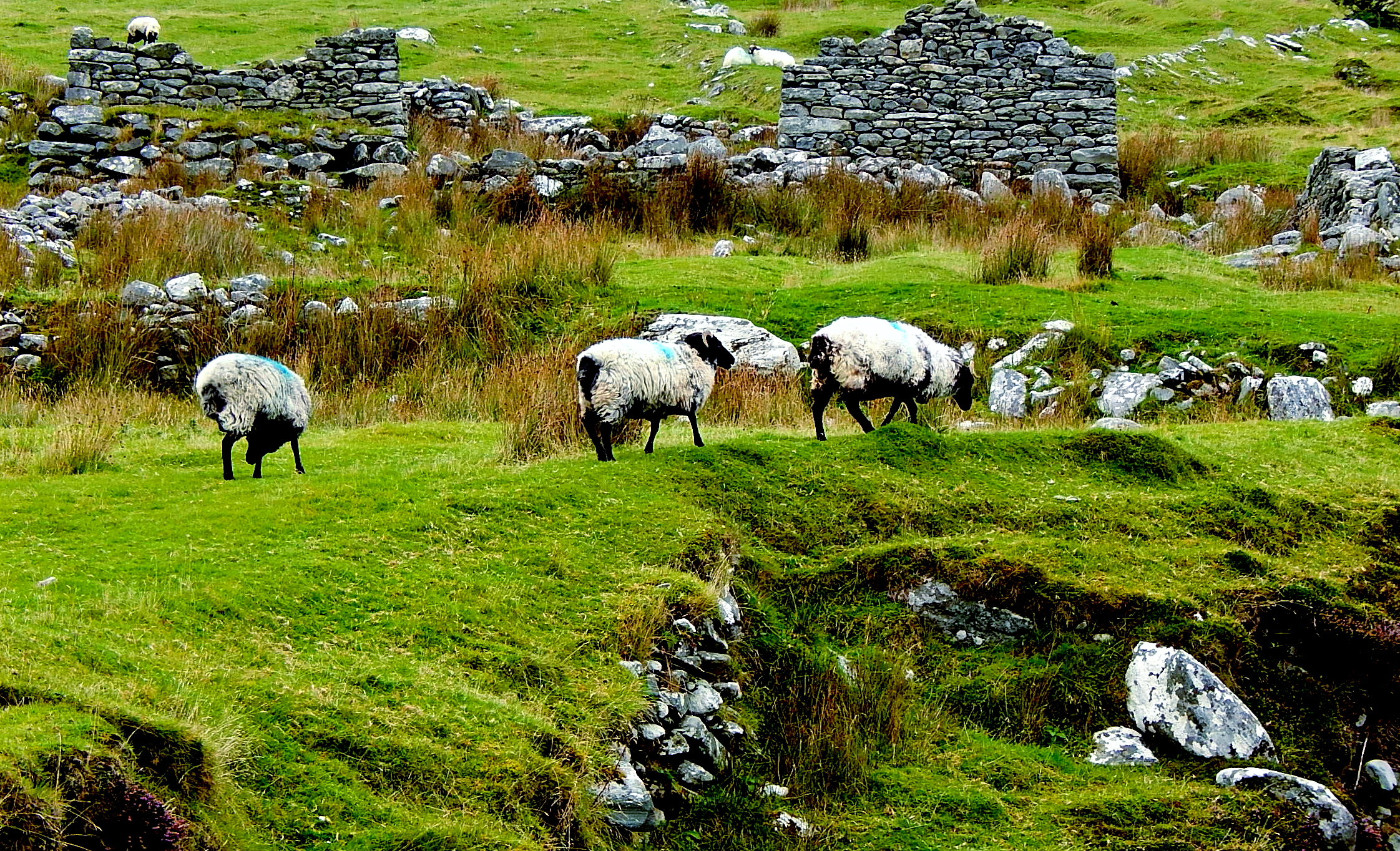
Deserted village on Achill

Mayo County Council is responsible for the governance of the islands, and islanders are entitled to certain benefits and exemptions, such as lower motor tax rates. The islands also receive funding from the Department of Culture, Heritage and the Gaeltacht, as several offshore islands along with much of northwest Mayo are recognised Gaeltacht areas.

As many as 47 offshore islands had permanent populations prior to the Great Famine. Communities had resided on these islands for generations, and their remains can still be seen to this day through the villages, stone walls and lazybeds which they left behind. By the end of the 19th century most of the county's islands had been deserted. In contrast, Achill benefitted from a bridge to the mainland which allowed the population to temporarily rebound, reaching its all-time peak in 1911.

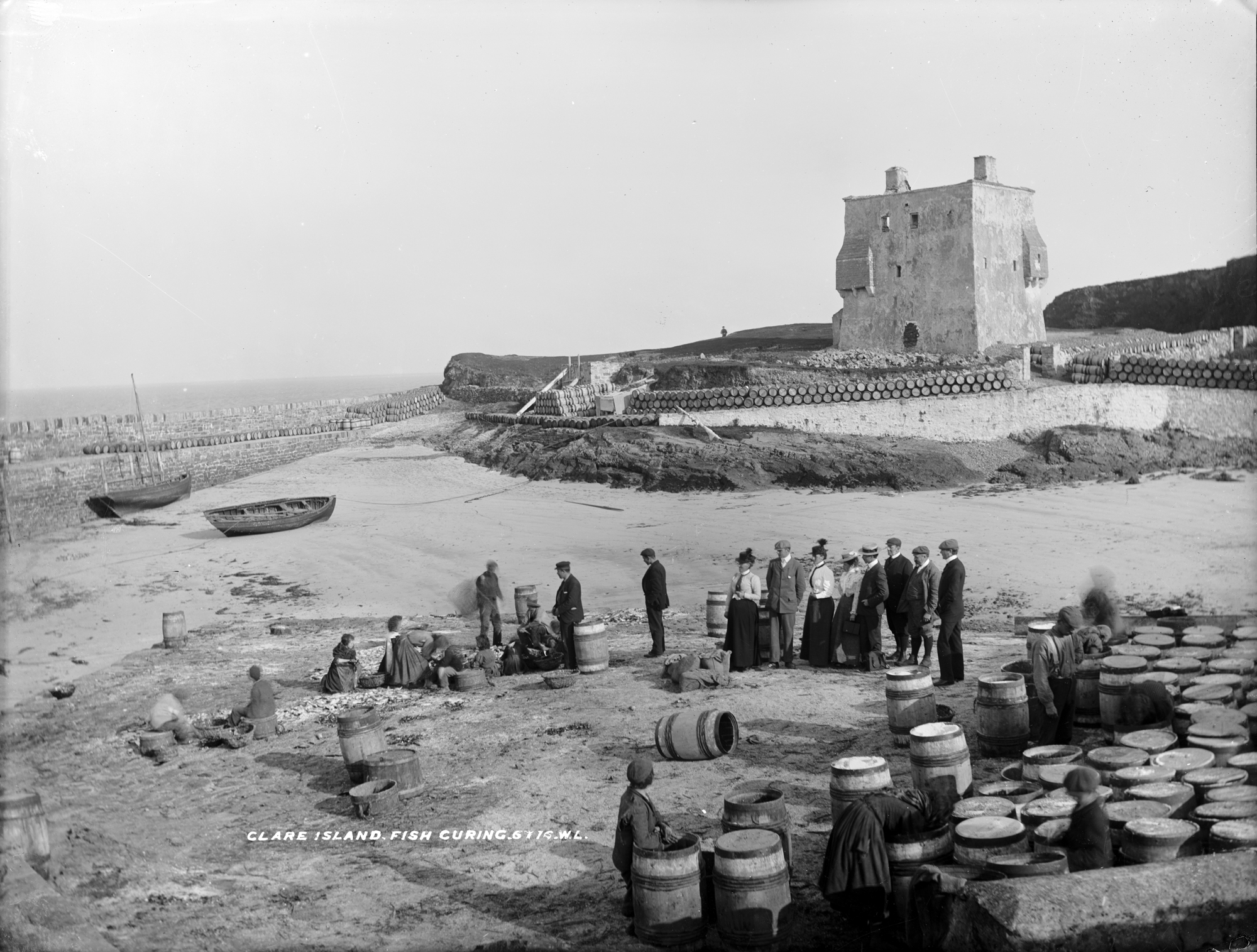
Fish curing on Clare Island, c. 1900

Emigration from the islands continued into the 20th-century as traditional industries such as fishing and textiles were unable to provide an attractive, or in many cases adequate, income to young islanders. In recent times, the islands have become a popular tourist destination and depend heavily on the tourism and hospitality sector. Their population swells during the summer months, particularly on Achill and Clare. Popular activities include surfing, sailing, island-hopping in Clew Bay, spiritual retreats and eco-tourism.

The following table shows population trends for the fourteen currently inhabited islands as of the last census. The overall trend is a continuing decline in the population of Mayo's offshore islands, which is currently at a historic low. The county as a whole was one of just three in Ireland to record a population decrease between 2011 and 2016. The population of Mayo during this time decreased by 0.2%, whereas the population of the islands fell by 5.3%. Although the overall population fell during this time, four previously uninhabited islands received new residents, including Achillbeg, which had been uninhabited since 1965.

=== Currently inhabited islands ===
Rank	Island	Barony	Population			
Rank	Island	Barony	2016	2011	1841	Peak Population (if not 1841)
1	Achill	Burrishoole	2,440	2,569	4,901	5,260 (1911)
2	Clare	Murrisk	159	168	1,615	
3	Inishturk	Murrisk	51	53	577	
4	Inis Bigil	Erris	18	25	67	162 (1926)
5	Collanmore	Burrishoole	7	4	213	215 (1851)
6	Inishnakillew	Burrishoole	6	7	126	
7	Inishlyre	Burrishoole	4	4	113	122 (1851)
8	Clynish	Burrishoole	4	4	87	
9	Inish Turk Beg	Burrishoole	4	10	57	
10	Duvillaun More	Erris	2	2	31	
11	Collanbeg	Burrishoole	2	0	4	9 (1861)
12	Achillbeg	Burrishoole	1	0	178	
13	Inishkea North	Burrishoole	1	0	155	
14	Rosbarnagh	Burrishoole	1	0	42	
	Total		2,700	2,846	8,166	
	Change		-5.3%	-65.2%	-	

=== Formerly inhabited islands ===
Island	Barony	Population		
Island	Barony	1841	Peak Population (if not 1841)	Year Abandoned
Rosmore Island	Burrishoole	133		
Moynish More	Burrishoole	99		1881-1891
Island More	Burrishoole	88		
Rosturk Island	Burrishoole	64		
Inishkea South	Erris	62		1934
Inishdaff	Burrishoole	57		
Inishgowla South	Burrishoole	52		
Inishtubbrid	Burrishoole	42		
Knockycahillaun	Burrishoole	41		
Inishcottle	Burrishoole	40	45 (1911)	2011-2016
Derrinish	Burrishoole	40		
Inishquirk	Burrishoole	37		
Inisheeny	Burrishoole	36		
Annagh Islands	Erris	33		1851
Illanataggart	Burrishoole	33		
Inishgort	Burrishoole	32	35 (1871)	2006-2011
Crovinish	Burrishoole	32		
Inishoo	Burrishoole	29		
Bartragh Island	Tirawley	28		1951
Inisherkin	Burrishoole	28		
Inishgowla	Burrishoole	28		
Inishnacross	Burrishoole	27		
Inishraher	Burrishoole	25		
Inishturlin	Burrishoole	25		
Inishkeel	Burrishoole	23		
Inishbee	Burrishoole	20		
Inishglora	Erris	16		
Eagle Island	Erris	15	22 (1861)	1988
Dorinish	Burrishoole	13	15 (1871)	1901
Inishbobunnan	Burrishoole	13		
Inishilra	Burrishoole	12		
Inishcooa	Burrishoole	6		
Barranagh Island	Erris	0	1 (1874)	late 1800s
Blackrock Island	Erris	0	15 (1881)	1974
Roman Island	Burrishoole	0	36 (1911)	1966-1971
	Total	1,229		

== Islands of Mayo by area ==
=== Larger islands ===
With the exception of Achill, County Mayo's islands are generally small in size, with only 13 larger than 100 acres (40 ha) and 3 larger than 1,000 acres (400 ha). There are numerous offshore islands in the 10 to 100 acre range, along with at least 15 freshwater islands larger than 10 acres, the largest of which is Illannaglashy on Lough Conn at 82 acres (33 ha).

The one hundred largest islands in the county are listed below. "F" designates a freshwater island.

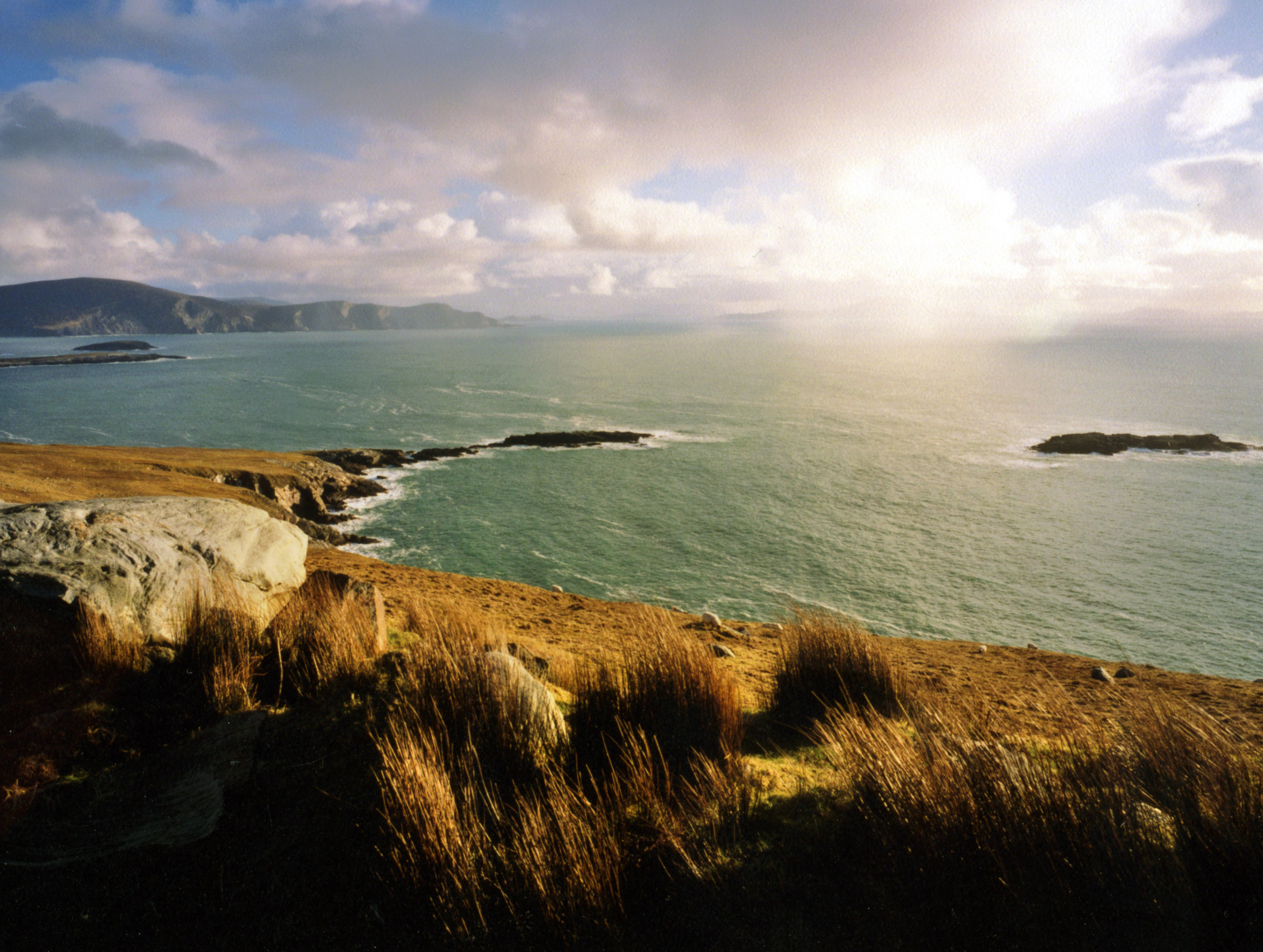
Achill

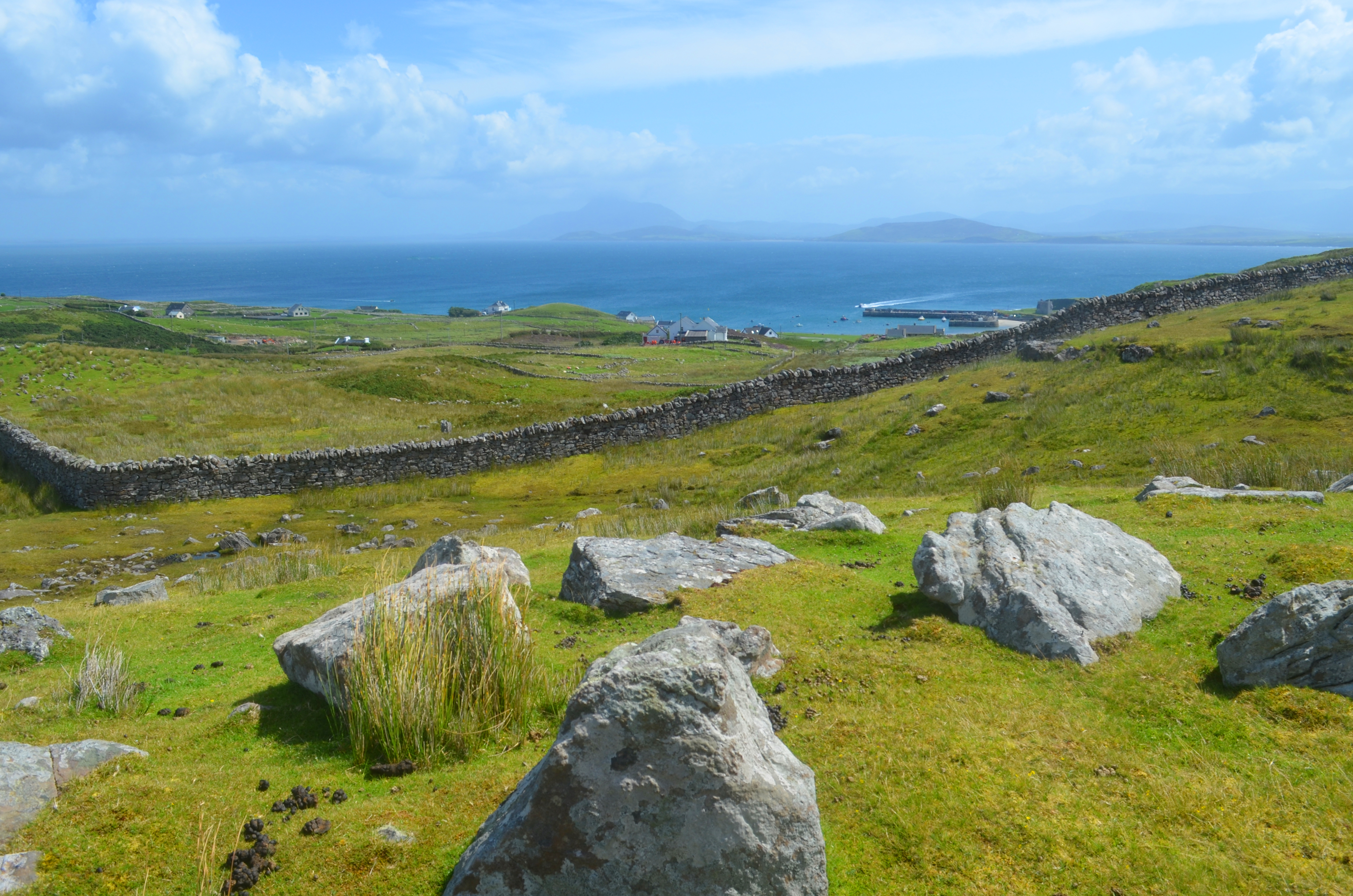
Clare Island

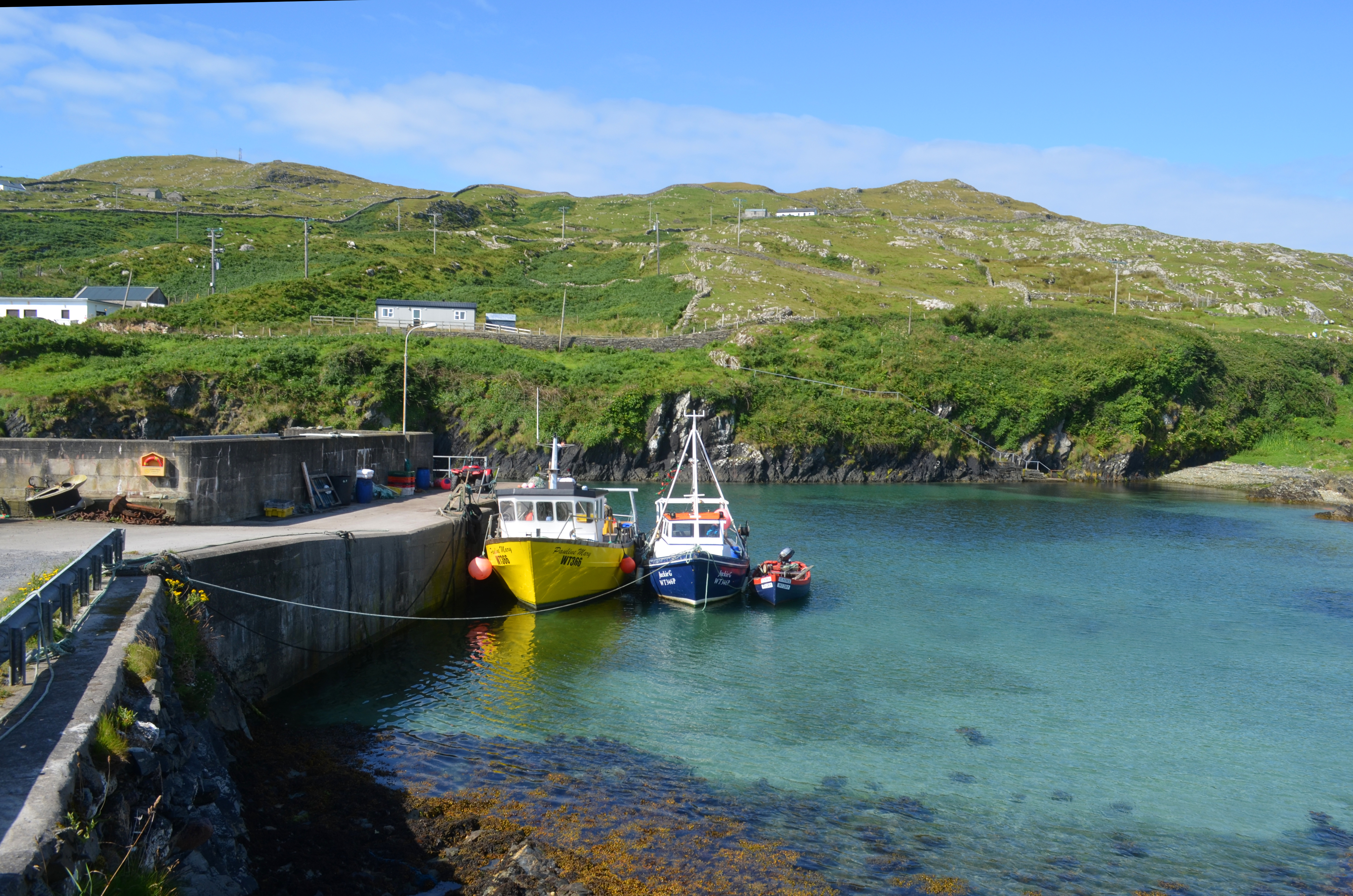
Inishturk

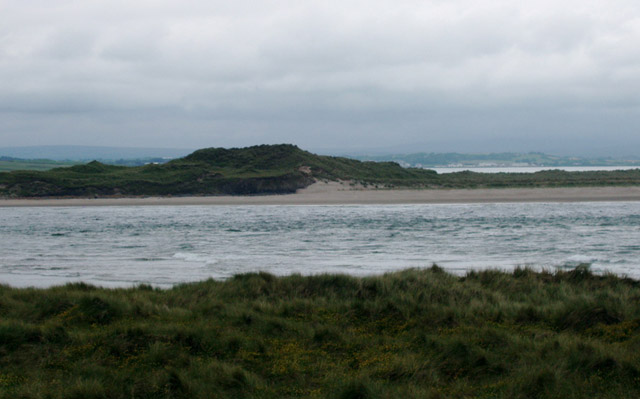
Bartragh Island

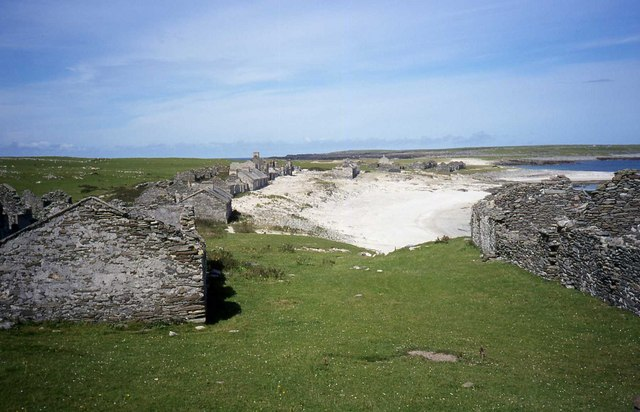
Inishkea South

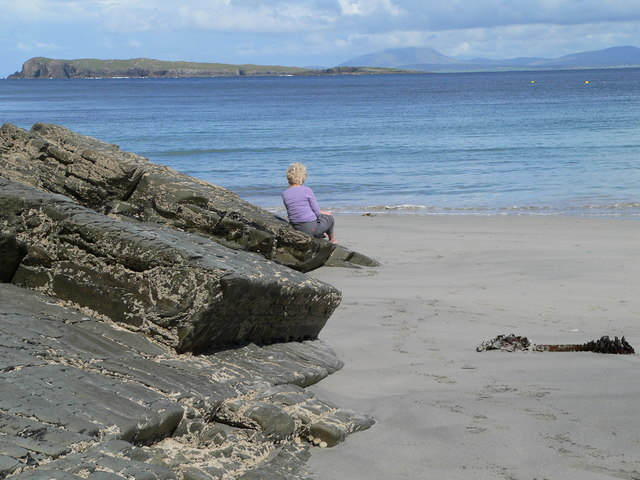
Caher Island

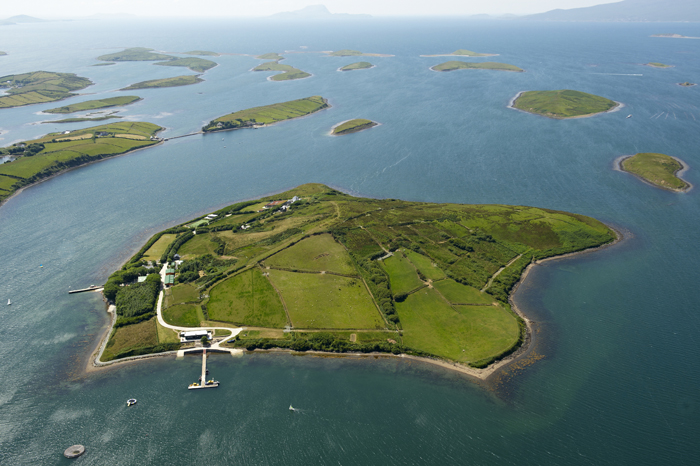
Inish Turk Beg

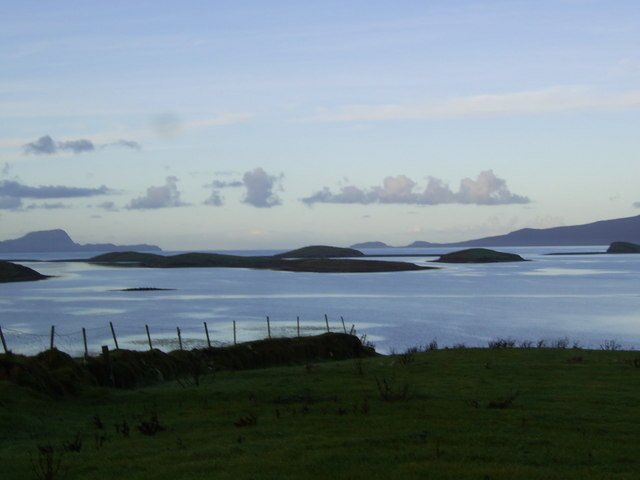
Inishnakillew

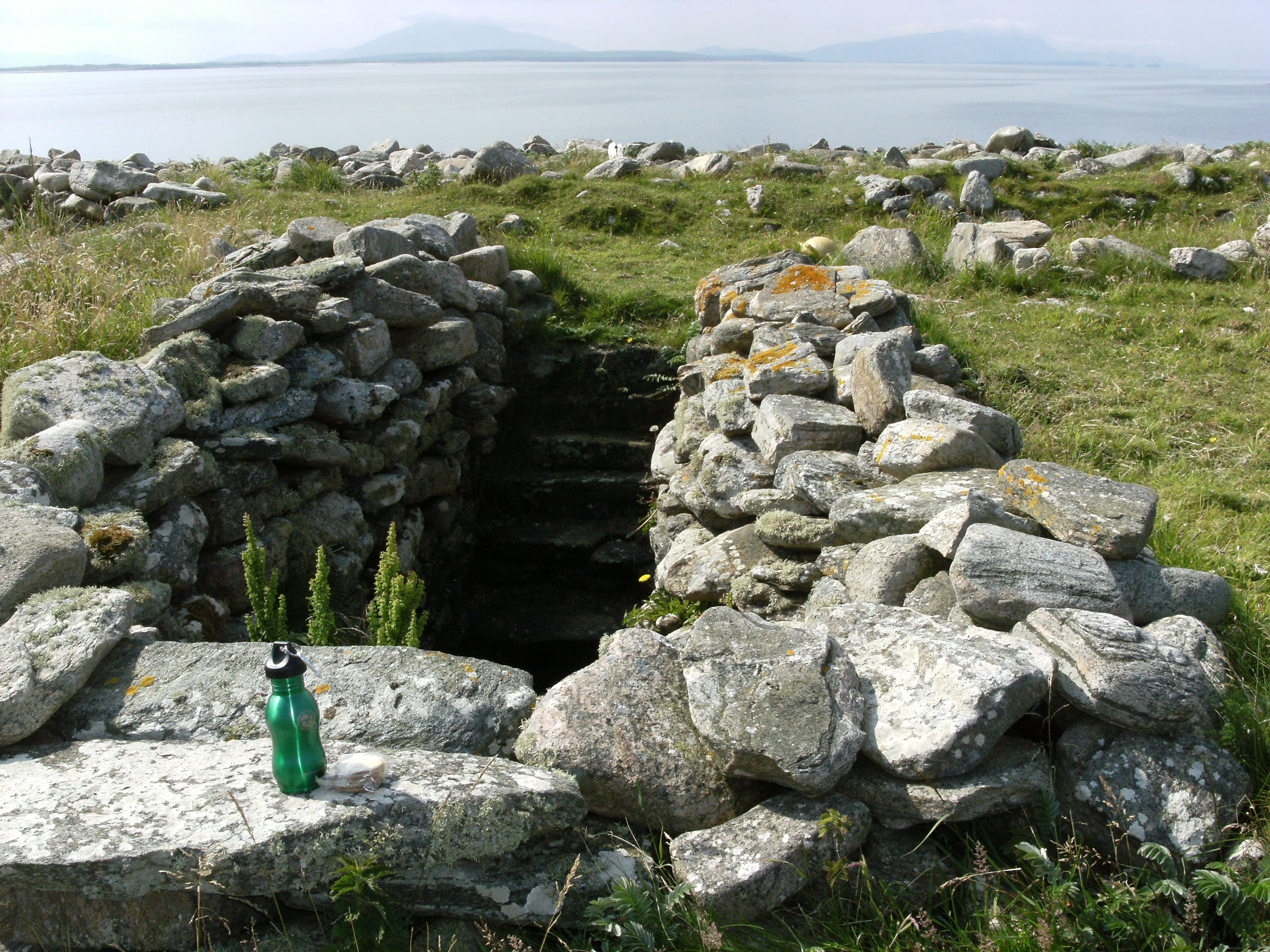
Inishglora

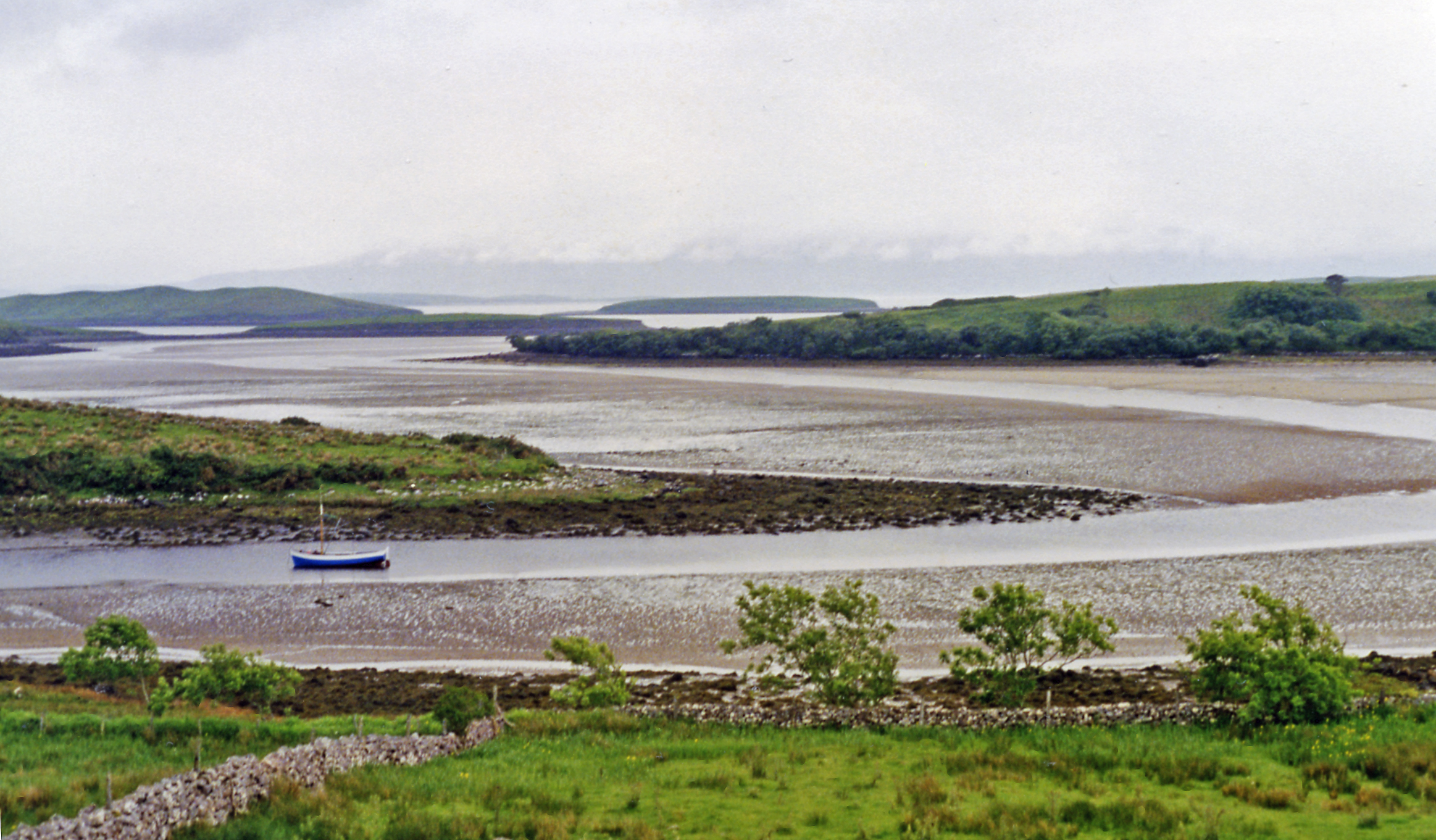
Rosturk

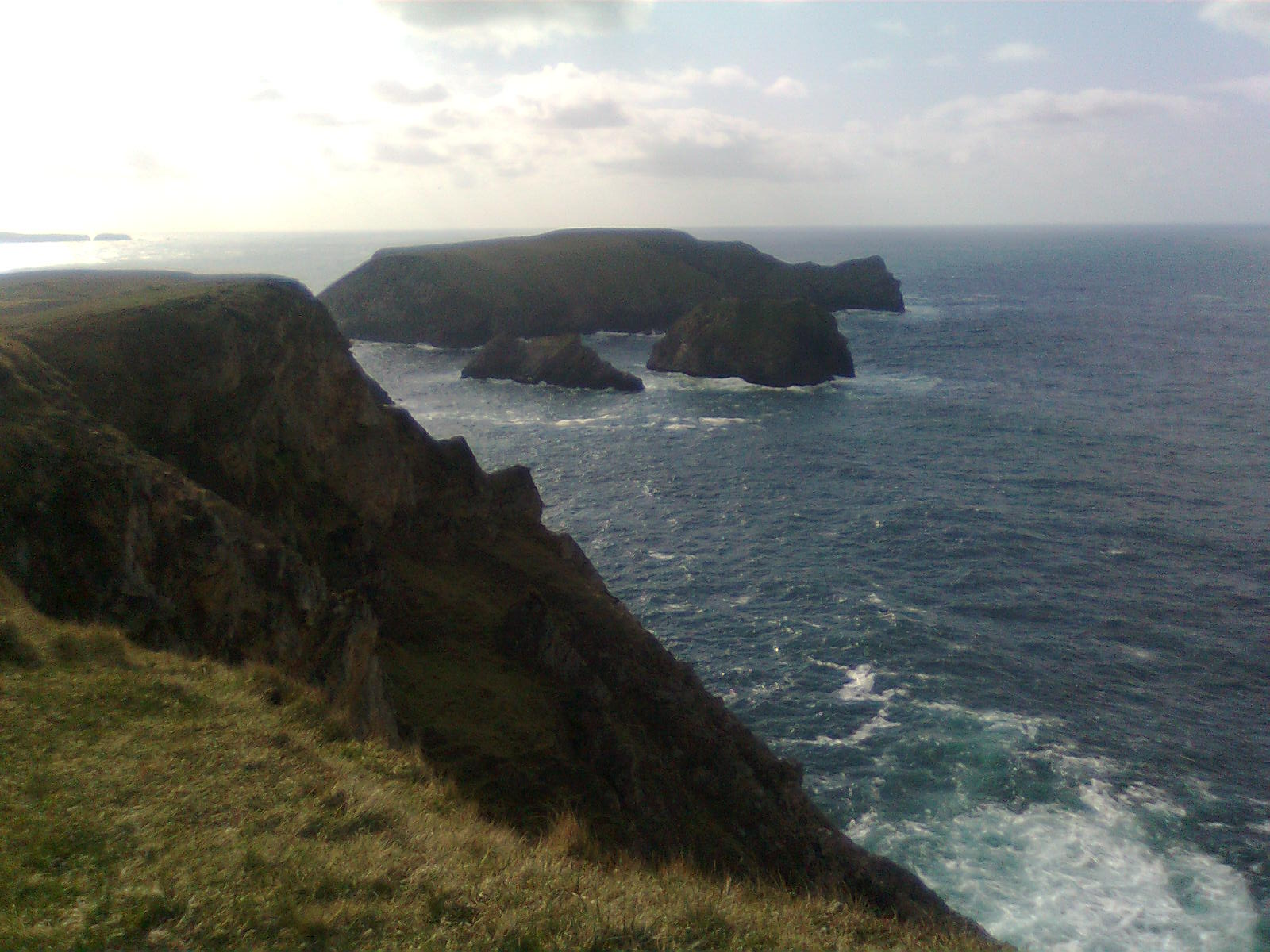
Kid Island

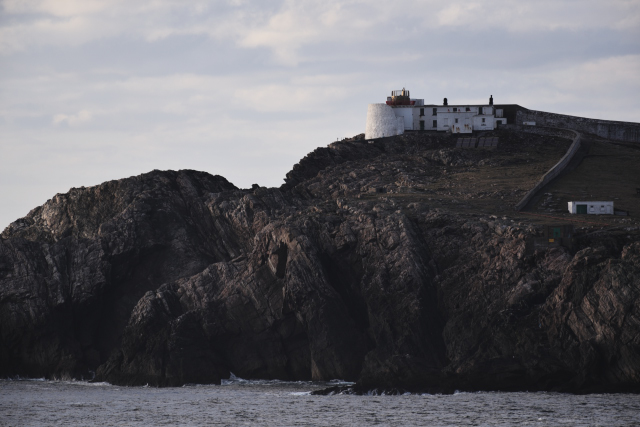
Eagle Island

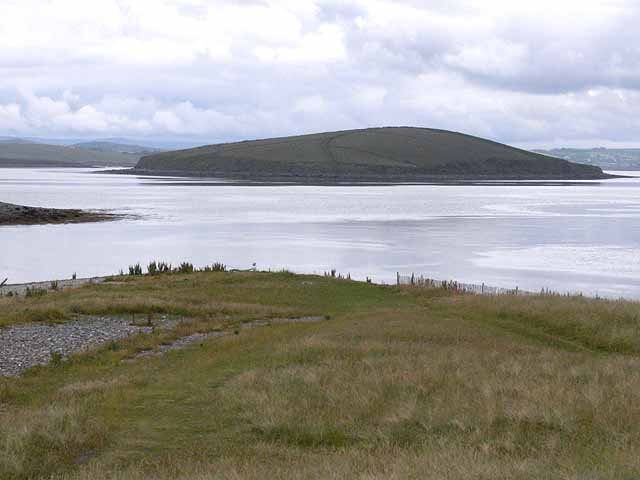
Inishraher

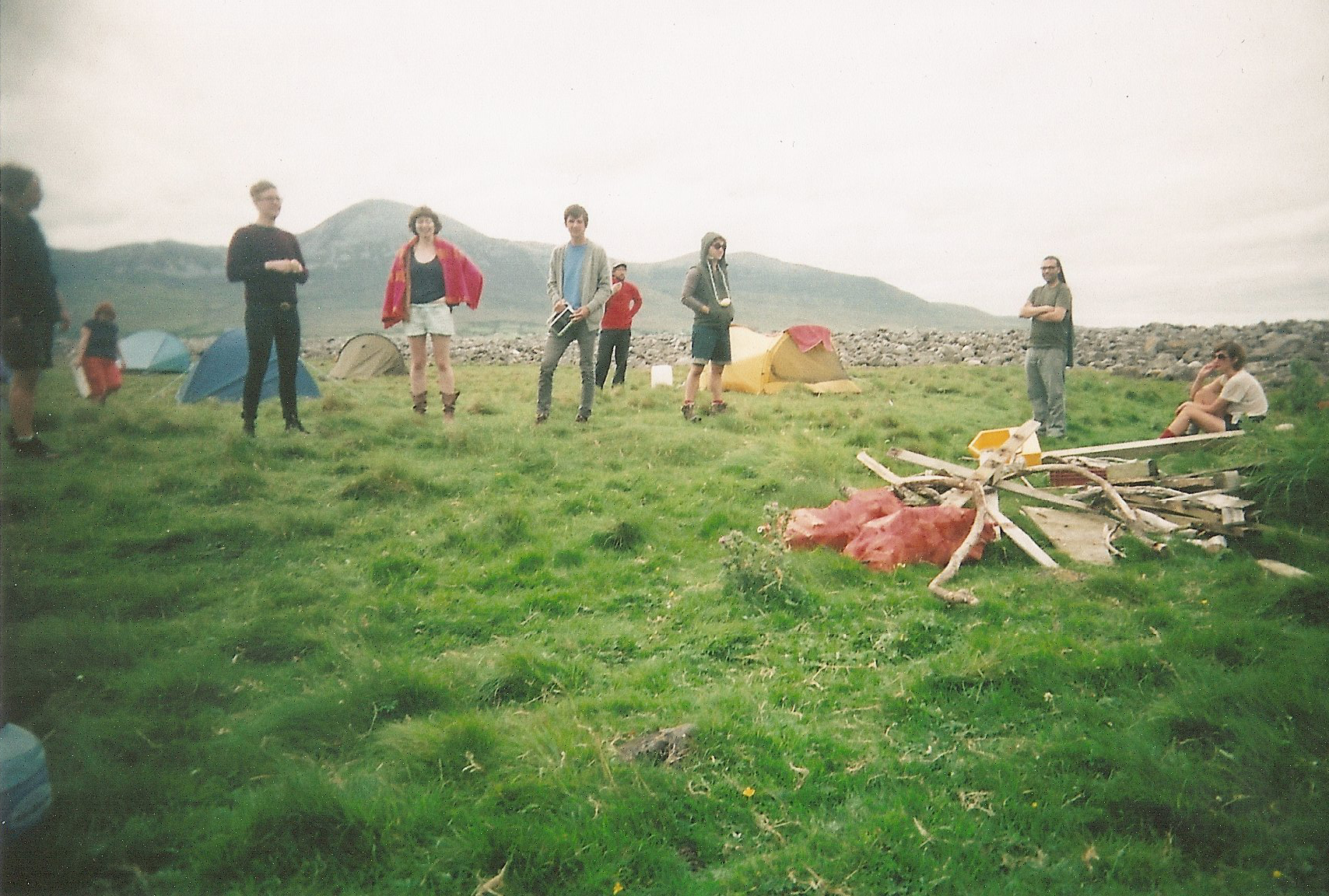
Dorinish

Island	Irish name (Note: Taken from the Placenames Database of Ireland)	Archipelago / Location	Area (Acres) (Note: Where available, area is from Ordnance Survey Ireland's Cassini 6" maps. Otherwise area is from 19th-century 6" maps (both viewable via the Historic 6" layer of the link in the OS-map column))	Highest Point (Note: Unless stated otherwise, height is from Ordnance Survey Ireland's 1:50,000 series maps (viewable for Republic of Ireland islands via the Wind Report layer of the link in the OS-map column ))
Achill	Acaill	Achill Islands	36,572	688 m (2,257 ft)
Clare	Oileán Chliara	Clew Bay	4,053	462 m (1,516 ft)
Inishturk	Inis Toirc	Atlantic Islands	1,620	191 m (627 ft)
Inishbiggle	Inis Bigil	Achill Islands	637	34 m (112 ft)
Annagh Island	Oileán an Eanaigh	Achill Islands	627	23 m (75 ft)
Inishkea North	Inis Gé Thuaidh	Inishkea Islands	574	24 m (79 ft)
Bartragh Island	An Bheartrach	Killala Bay	477	26 m (85 ft)
Inishkea South	Inis Gé Theas	Inishkea Islands	389	72 m (236 ft)
Achillbeg	Acaill Bheag	Achill Islands	331	110 m (360 ft)
Collanmore Island	Collainn Mhór	Clew Bay	199	53 m (174 ft)
Duvillaun More	Dubhoileán Mór	Duvillaun Islands	177	63 m (207 ft)
Caher Island	Cathair na Naomh	Atlantic Islands	130	61 m (200 ft)
Rosmore Island	An Ros Mór	Newport Bay	116	28 m (92 ft)
Illannaglashy (F)	Oileán na Glaise	Lough Conn	82	27 m (89 ft)
Clynish	Claínis	Clew Bay	81	42 m (138 ft)
Island More	An tOileán Mór	Clew Bay	78	42 m (138 ft)
Barranagh Island	Oileán Bearanach	Blacksod Bay	74	7 m (23 ft)
Inish Turk Beg	Inis Toirc Bheag	Clew Bay	64	53 m (174 ft)
Inishnakillew	Inis na Coilleadh	Newport Bay	64	27 m (89 ft)
Moynish More	Maínis Mór	Clew Bay	62	37 m (121 ft)
Inishglora	Inis Gluaire	Atlantic Islands	60	22 m (72 ft)
Inishbee	Inis Bí	Newport Bay	56	29 m (95 ft)
Duvillaun Beg	Dubhoileán Beag	Duvillaun Islands	53	14 m (46 ft)
Rosbarnagh Island	Oileán Ros Bairneach	Newport Bay	53	37 m (121 ft)
Inishlyre	Inis Ladhair	Dorinish Harbour	52	26 m (85 ft)
Annagh Island East	An tEanach Thoir	Wesport Bay	48	9 m (30 ft)
Annagh Island (F)	Oileán an Eanaigh	Lough Conn	45	23 m (75 ft)
Inishtubbrid	Inis Tiobrad	Newport Bay	41	28 m (92 ft)
Inishdaff	Inis Damh	Newport Bay	40	31 m (102 ft)
Inishower (F)	Inis Odhar	Furnace Lough	36	16 m (52 ft)
Knockycahillaun	Cnoc Uí Chathaláin	Clew Bay	35	36 m (118 ft)
Carrigeenamore (F)	An Carraigín Mór	Lough Mask	35	22 m (72 ft)
Bleanmore Island	An Bhléan Mhór	Corraun Peninsula	34	14 m (46 ft)
Rosturk Island	Ros Toirc	Newport Bay	34	24 m (79 ft)
Inishgowla	Inis Gabhla	Newport Bay	33	28 m (92 ft)
Inishdegil More	Inis Téigil Mór	Atlantic Islands	32	12 m (39 ft)
Inishkeeragh	Inis Caorach	Atlantic Islands	32	17 m (56 ft)
Kid Island	Oileán Mionnán	Broadhaven Bay	32	86 m (282 ft)
Illanataggart	Oileán an tSagairt	Clew Bay	32	28 m (92 ft)
Carrickmoylenacurhoga	Carraig Bhéal na gCaróg	Inishkea Islands	32	14 m (46 ft)
Inishquirk	Inis Coirce	Newport Bay	32	44 m (144 ft)
Inishgort	Inis Goirt	Clew Bay	31	29 m (95 ft)
Inishsherkin	Inis Earcáin	Newport Bay	31	30 m (98 ft)
Inishkeel	Inis Caol	Newport Bay	30	27 m (89 ft)
Crovinish	Croibhinis	Dorinish Harbour	29	23 m (75 ft)
Derrinish	Dairinis	Newport Bay	29	21 m (69 ft)
Inishraher	Inis Raithir	Westport Bay	29	33 m (108 ft)
Inishlaughil	Inis Leamhchoille	Newport Bay	28	45 m (148 ft)
Bartraw Island	An Bheartrach	Westport Bay	28	13 m (43 ft)
Inishgowla South	Inis Gabhla Theas	Westport Bay	28	20 m (66 ft)
Inishnacross	Inis na Croise	Newport Bay	27	36 m (118 ft)
Inisheeny	Inis Aonaigh	Westport Bay	27	22 m (72 ft)
Muckinish	Muicinis	Newport Bay	26	37 m (121 ft)
Annaghroe Island (F)	An tEanach Rua	Lough Conn	25	18 m (59 ft)
Glassillan	An Glasoileán	Achill Island	25	23 m (75 ft)
Inishcottle	Inis Cotail	Newport Bay	25	26 m (85 ft)
Inishgleasty (F)	Inis Gléasta	Lough Mask	24	37 m (121 ft)
Inishbobunnan	Inis Bó Bonnán	Newport Bay	24	31 m (102 ft)
Eagle Island	Oileán sa Tuaidh	Atlantic Islands	23	60 m (200 ft)
Roeillaun	Rua-oileán	Clew Bay	23	33 m (108 ft)
Inishloy	Inis Láí	Newport Bay	23	10 m (33 ft)
Inishcooa	Inis Cua	Newport Bay	23	27 m (89 ft)
Long Island (F)	An tOileán Fada	Lough Mask	22	25 m (82 ft)
Rabbit Island	Oileán Bhríde	Clew Bay	21	22 m (72 ft)
Inishrobe (F)	Inis Róba	Lough Mask	21	30 m (98 ft)
Inishturlin	Inis Tuirlinge	Newport Bay	21	27 m (89 ft)
Inishcuill	Inis Coill	Newport Bay	21	28 m (92 ft)
Derreens Island (F)	An Doirín	Carrowmore Lake	20	8 m (26 ft)
Dorinish	Deoirinis	Clew Bay	20	30 m (98 ft)
Roslynagh	Ros Laighneach	Clew Bay	18	33 m (108 ft)
Illannambraher East	Oileán na mBráthar Thoir	Clew Bay	18	28 m (92 ft)
Carrickawilt	Carraig an Mhoilt	Inishkea Islands	18	9 m (30 ft)
Inishoght (F)	Inis Uicht	Lough Mask	18	25 m (82 ft)
Collanbeg Island	Collainn Bheag	Clew Bay	17	25 m (82 ft)
Inishoo	Inis Uamha	Clew Bay	17	32 m (105 ft)
Annagh Island West	An tEanach Thiar	Westport Bay	17	11 m (36 ft)
Inishdaweel	Inis Dá Mhaol	Clew Bay	16	38 m (125 ft)
Carrigee	Carraig Aodha	Inishkea Islands	16	15 m (49 ft)
River Island (F)	Oileán na hAbhann	Lough Mask	16	13 m (43 ft)
Saints Island (F)	Inis Na Naomh	Lough Mask	16	30 m (98 ft)
Inishdurra (F)	Inis Dura	Lough Mask	16	32 m (105 ft)
Inishleague	Inis Liag	Wesport Bay	16	24 m (79 ft)
Baunros More	Bánros Mór	Killala Bay	15	13 m (43 ft)
Inishdalla	Inis Deala	Atlantic Islands	15	27 m (89 ft)
Inishdasky	Inis Teasctha	Clew Bay	15	30 m (98 ft)
Annaghteige Island (F)	Eanach Thaidhg	Lough Conn	15	27 m (89 ft)
Rabbit Island	Oileán Bhríde	Newport Bay	15	28 m (92 ft)
Illandavuck	Oileán Dhabhaic	Atlantic Islands	14	56 m (184 ft)
Conors Island (F)	Oileán Chonchúir	Lough Carra	14	20 m (66 ft)
Inishfesh	Inis Feise	Clew Bay	13	10 m (33 ft)
Inishaghoo	Inis Achadh	Achill Islands	13	20 m (66 ft)
Carrigeenagur Island (F)	Carraigín na gCorr	Lough Mask	13	23 m (75 ft)
Pig Island (F)	Oileán na Muice	Lough Mask	13	28 m (92 ft)
Illannambraher West	Oileán na mBráthar Thiar	Clew Bay	12	25 m (82 ft)
Inishkee	Inis Caoich	Clew Bay	12	14 m (46 ft)
Inishdoonver	Inis Dúnmhar	Clew Bay	12	25 m (82 ft)
Lambs Island (F)	Oileán na nUan	Lough Mask	12	11 m (36 ft)
Devenish Island (F)	Daimhinis	Lough Mask	12	30 m (98 ft)
Annagh Island Middle	An tEanach Lár	Westport Bay	12	7 m (23 ft)
Goose Island	Inis na nGé	Killala Bay	12	12 m (39 ft)

== Smaller offshore islands ==
County Mayo has hundreds of smaller islands and islets. Most of the county's offshore islands are located in Clew Bay, with smaller clusters located around the Achill archipelago, the west and south coasts of the Mullet Peninsula, and Blacksod Bay. The list below is not exhaustive, and includes named offshore islands that are either extensive (typically greater than 2 acres in area) or in someway locally significant or identifiable.

Unlike the above list, this list is in alphabetical order and does not include freshwater islands.

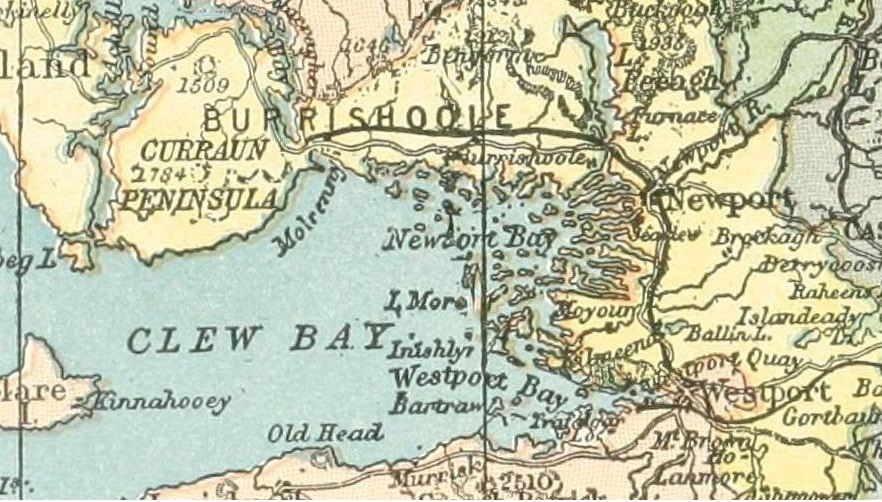
Map of Clew Bay (1890)

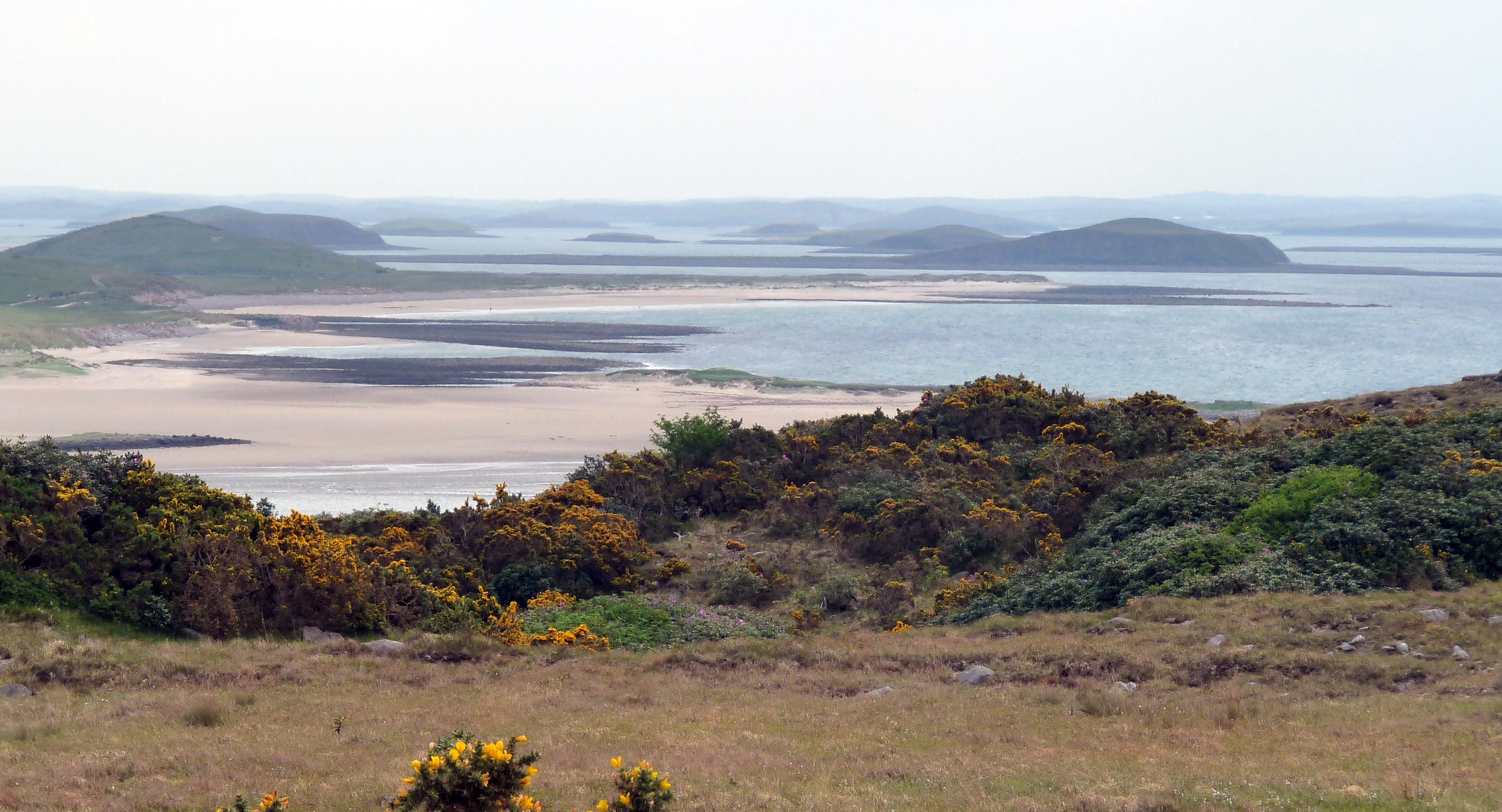
Small islands in Clew Bay

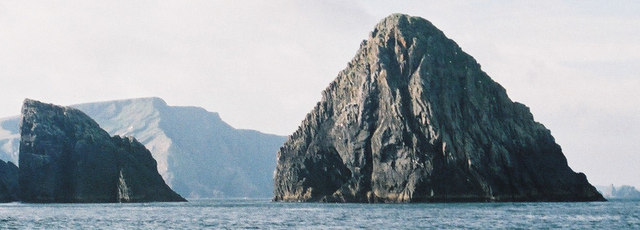
The Stags

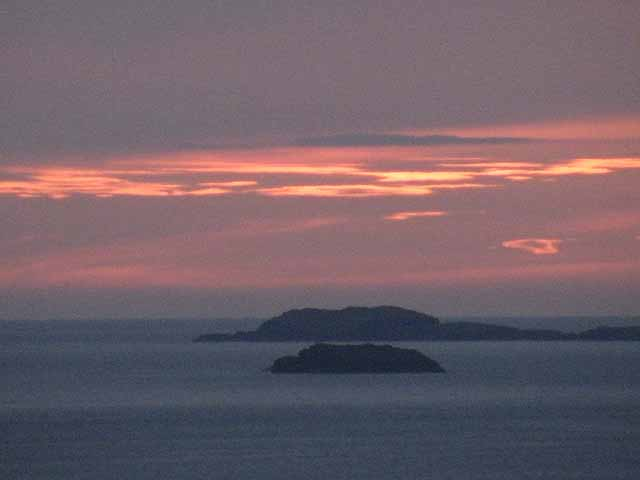
Mweelaun

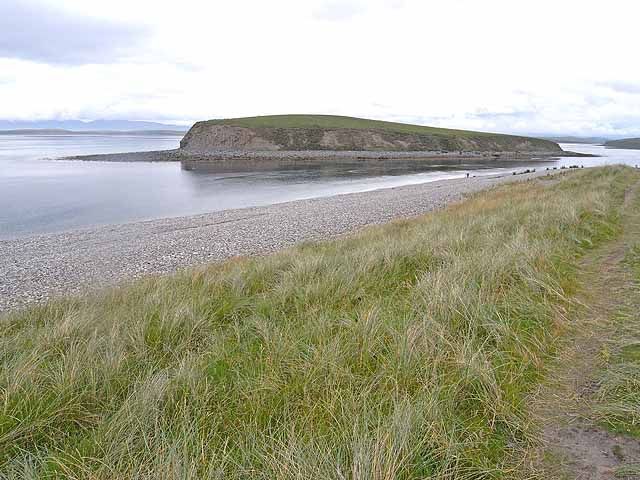
Inishdaugh

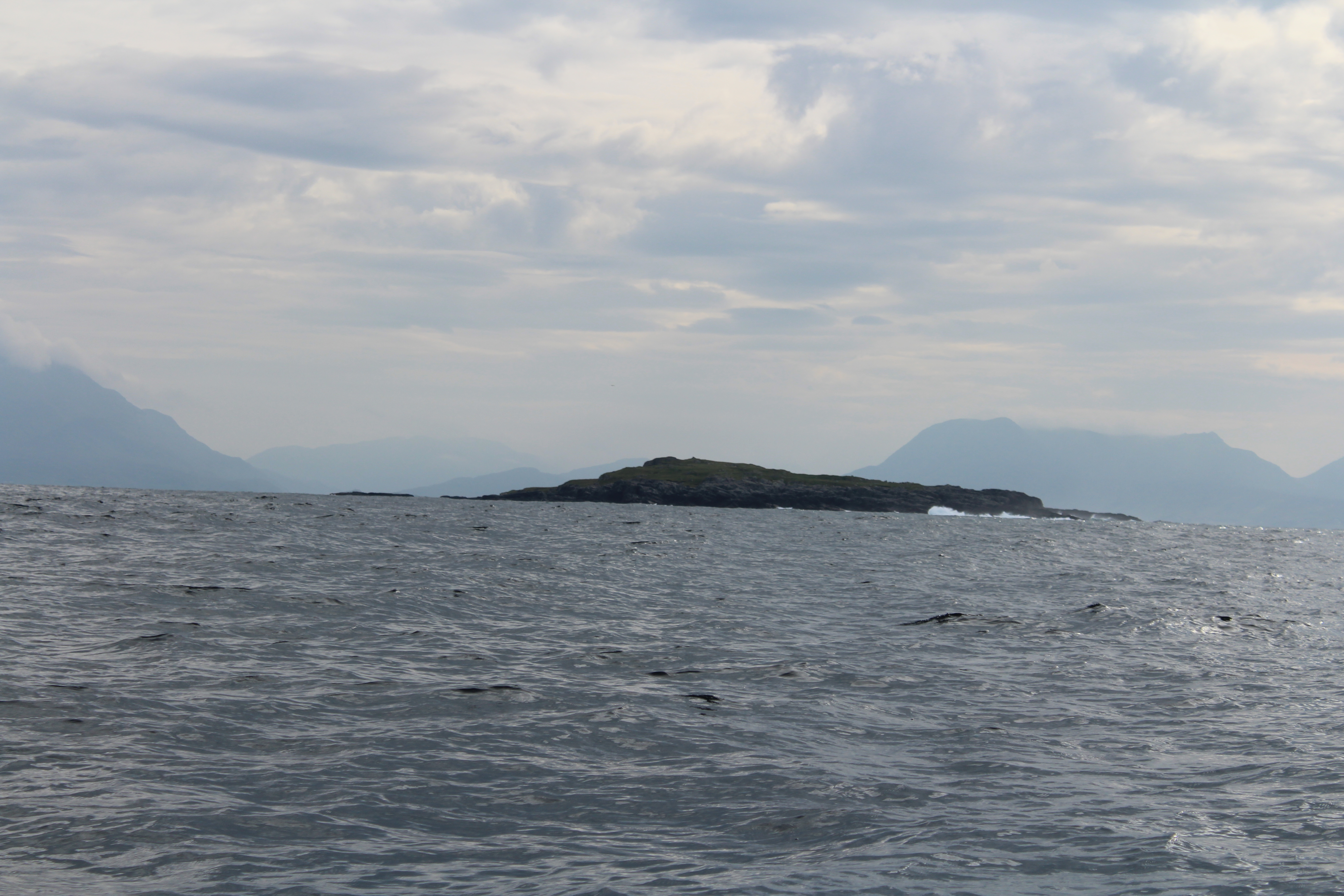
Inishdalla

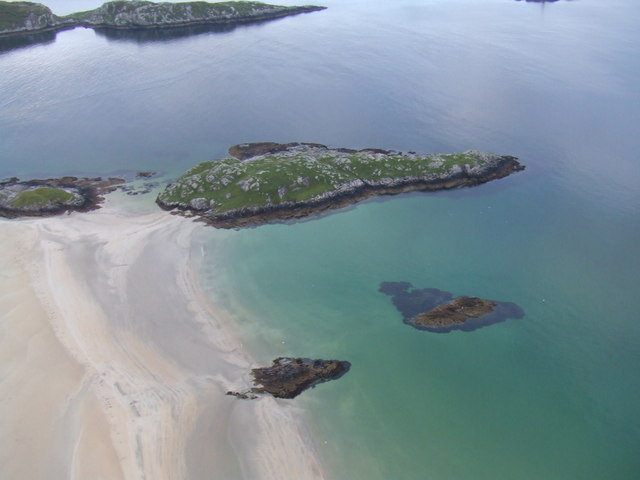
Islet off Killadoon

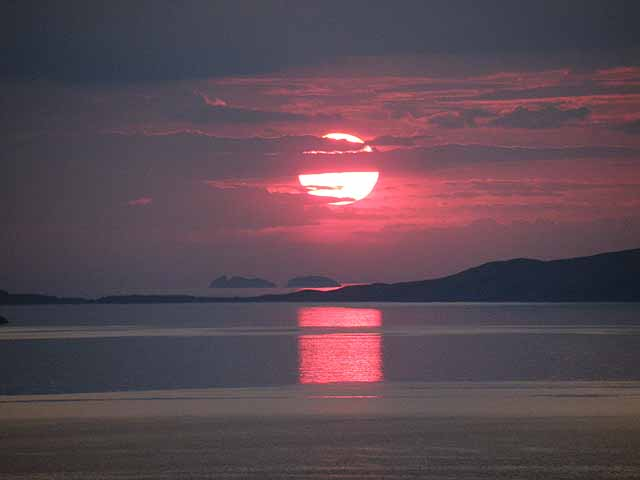
Bills Rocks

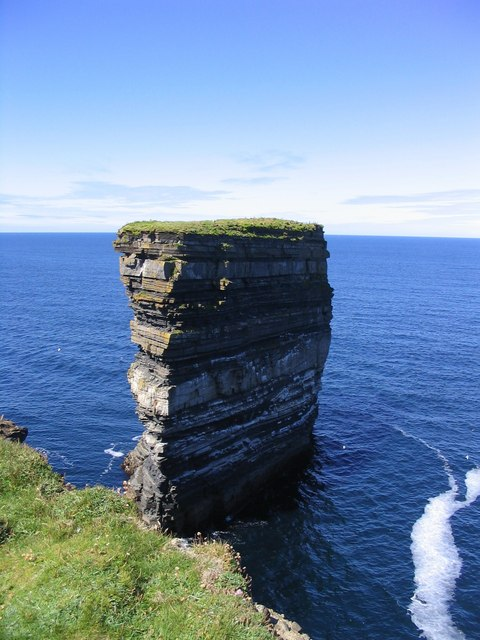
Dún Briste

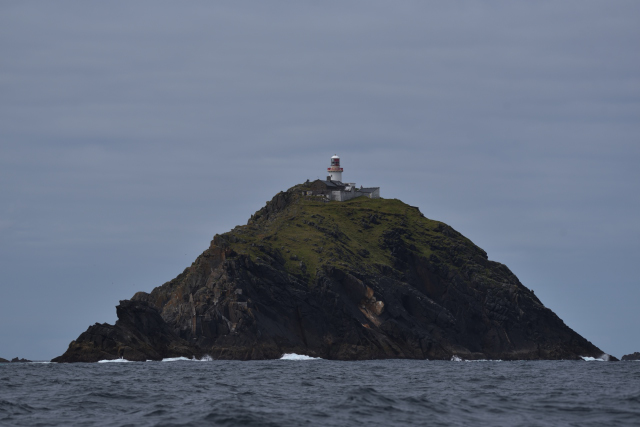
Blackrock Island

Island	Irish name	Archipelago / Location
Annagh Island	Oileán an Eanaigh	Mullet Peninsula
Ardillaun	Ardoileán	Killala Bay
Attimonbeg	Áth Tíomáin Beag	Killala Bay
Baunros Beg	Bánros Beag	Killala Bay
Baunros More	Bánros Mór	Killala Bay
Beetle Island North	Oileán an tSindile Thuaidh	Clew Bay
Beetle Island South	Oileán an tSindile Theas	Clew Bay
Bills Rocks	Carraig Bill	Atlantic Islands
Blackrock Island	An Tor	Atlantic Islands
Buddagh	An Chailleach	Benwee Head
Calf Island	Oileán an Ghamhna	Clew Bay
Calf Island	Oileán an Ghamhna	Killala Bay
Camel Island	Oileán Camall	Newport Bay
Carrickduff	An Charraig Dhubh	Mullet Peninsula
Carrickduff	An Charraig Dhubh	North Mayo Coast
Carrickhesk	Carraig Sheisc	Mullet Peninsula
Carricknaronty	Carraig na Rónta	Atlantic Islands
Carricknaronty North	Carraig na Rónta Thuaidh	Mullet Peninsula
Carricknaweeloge	Carraig na bhFaoileog	Mullet Peninsula
Carrigeenglass North	An Carraigín Glas Thuaidh	Clew Bay
Cone Island	Oileán an Chuain	Mullet Peninsula
Corillan	Corroileán	Westport Bay
Carrigeenaveagh	Carraigín na bhFiach	Clew Bay
Cregnarullah	Sceir na Roilleach	Mullet Peninsula
Cross Rock	An Charraig Dhubh	Mullet Peninsula
Doonvinalla	An Dúna	Benwee Head
Doonbristy Island	Dún Briste	North Mayo Coast
Dooneen Island	An Dúnín	Uggool Beach
Finnaun Island	Fionnán	Westport Bay
Forillan	Foroileán	Westport Bay
Freaghillan	Fraochoileán	Killala Bay
Freaghillan East	Fraochoileán Thoir	Newport Bay
Freaghillanluggagh	Fraochoileán Logach	Newport Bay
Glassillaun	Glasoileán	North Mayo Coast
Green Island	An tOileán Glas	Westport Bay
Green Island	An tOileán Glas	Killala Bay
Heath Island	Oileán Fraoigh	Corraun Peninsula
Horse Island	Oileán na gCapall	North Mayo Coast
Illancroagh	Oileán Cruaiche	Corraun Peninsula
Illanleamnahelty	Oileán Léim na hEilte	Atlantic Islands
Illanmaster	Oileán Máistir	North Mayo Coast
Illanmaw	Má-oileán	Clew Bay
Illannaconney	Oileán an Chonnaidh	Clew Bay
Illannakanoge	Oileán na gCánóg	North Mayo Coast
Illannamona	Oileán na Móna	Achill Islands
Illaunatee	Oileán an Tí	Clew Bay
Illaunroe	An tOileán Rua	Clew Bay
Inishacrick	Inis an Chnoic	Clew Bay
Inishbollog	Inis Bolg	Clew Bay
Inishcannon	Inis Ceannann	Newport Bay
Inishcoragh	Inis Córach	Newport Bay
Inishcorky	Inis Corcaí	Clew Bay
Inishdaugh	Inis Deách	Clew Bay
Inishdeash Beg	Inis Déise Beag	Clew Bay
Inishdeash More	Inis Déise Mór	Clew Bay
Inishderry	Inis Doire	Mullet Peninsula
Inishilra	Inis Iolra	Clew Bay
Inishimmel	Inis Imill	Westport Bay
Inishlaghan	Inis Lachan	Clew Bay
Inishlim	Inis Loim	Clew Bay
Inishmolt	Inis Molt	Newport Bay
Kid Island East	Oileán na Meannán	Newport Bay
Mauherillan	Máthairoileán	Newport Bay
Money Beg	An Muine Bheag	Clew Bay
Moynish Beg	Maínis Beag	Clew Bay
Mweelaun	Mhaoilinne	Atlantic Islands
Pig Island	Oileán na Muice	North Mayo Coast
Quinsheen Island	Cuinsín	Clew Bay
Roeillan	Rua-oileán	Achill Islands
Rosnambraher	Ros na mBráthar	Newport Bay
Sloe Island	Oileán na nAirní	Westport Bay
The Stags	Na Stacaí	Benwee Head
Toghercloheen	Barr na Spince	North Mayo Coast
Torduff	An Tor Dubh	North Mayo Coast

== Freshwater islands ==
There are numerous large loughs within the county, containing hundreds of small freshwater islands. Lough Mask in southern Mayo is the largest lough in the county. At 83 km^{2} (21,000 acres) it is the 6th-largest lough in Ireland (as well as the 6th-largest in Britain and Ireland). Further south, Lough Corrib is the 2nd-largest lough in Ireland; however, only a small portion of this lough is located within the county.

Illannaglashy, on Lough Conn, is the largest freshwater island in the county, at 82 acres (33 ha) in area. Freshwater islands have played an important role in the county's history and host an abundance of castles, monasteries, church ruins and unspoiled woodlands.

=== Lough Mask ===
Loughs of northern Mayo

Loughs of southern Mayo

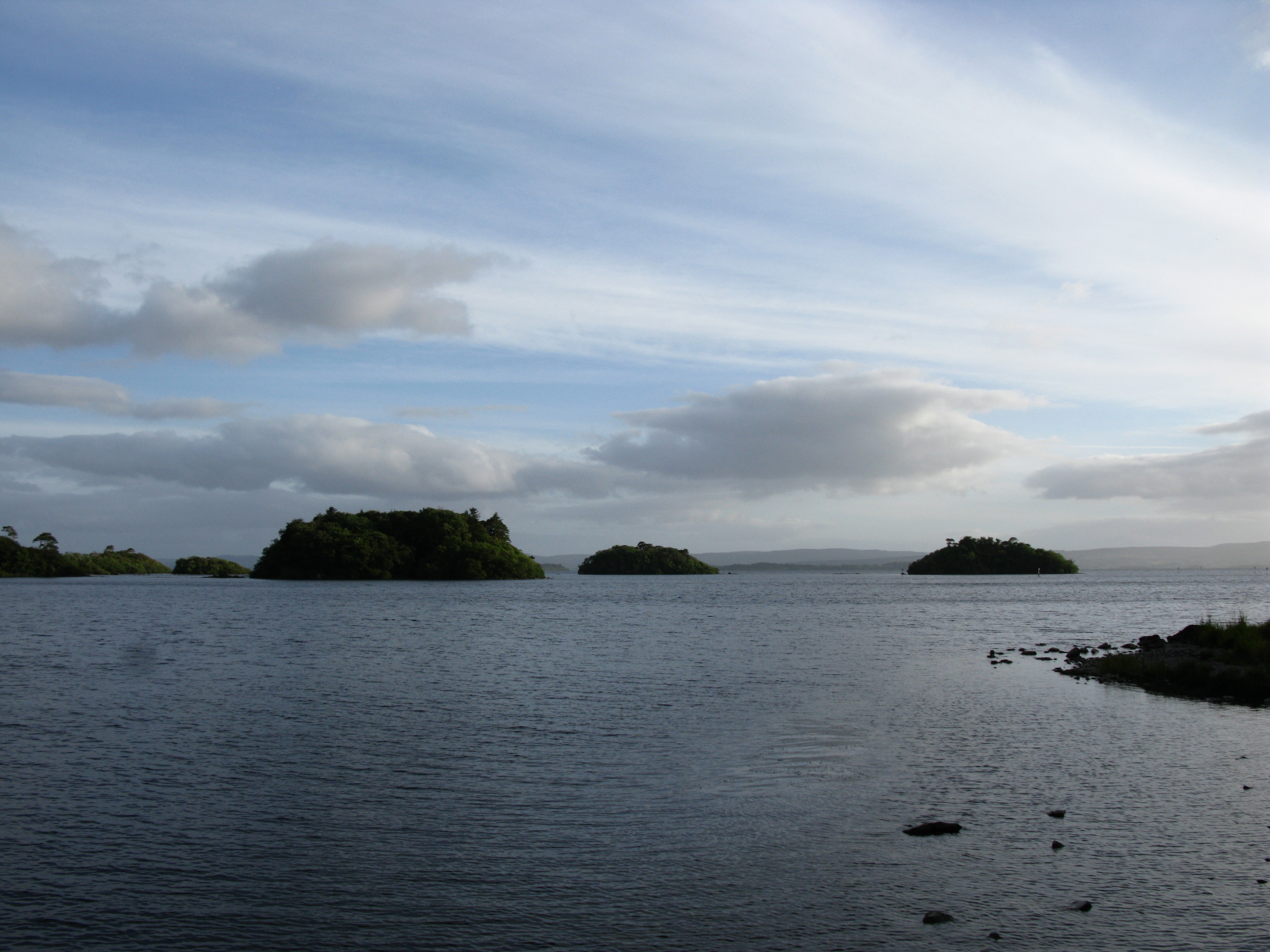
Lough Corrib

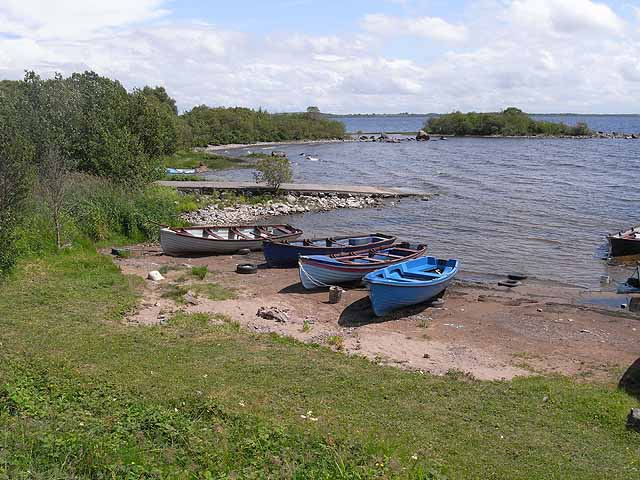
Lough Mask

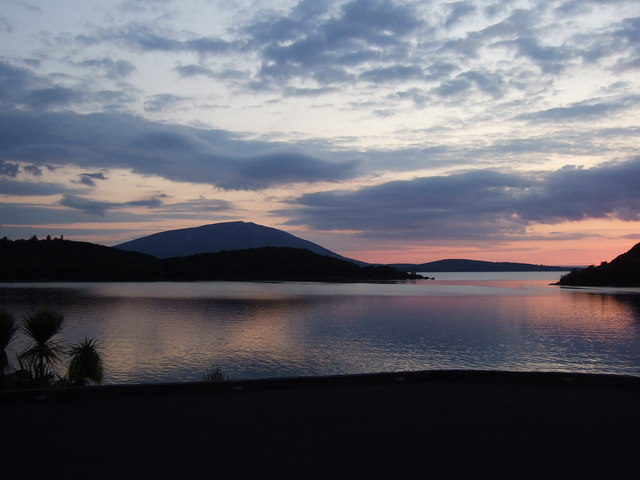
Lough Conn

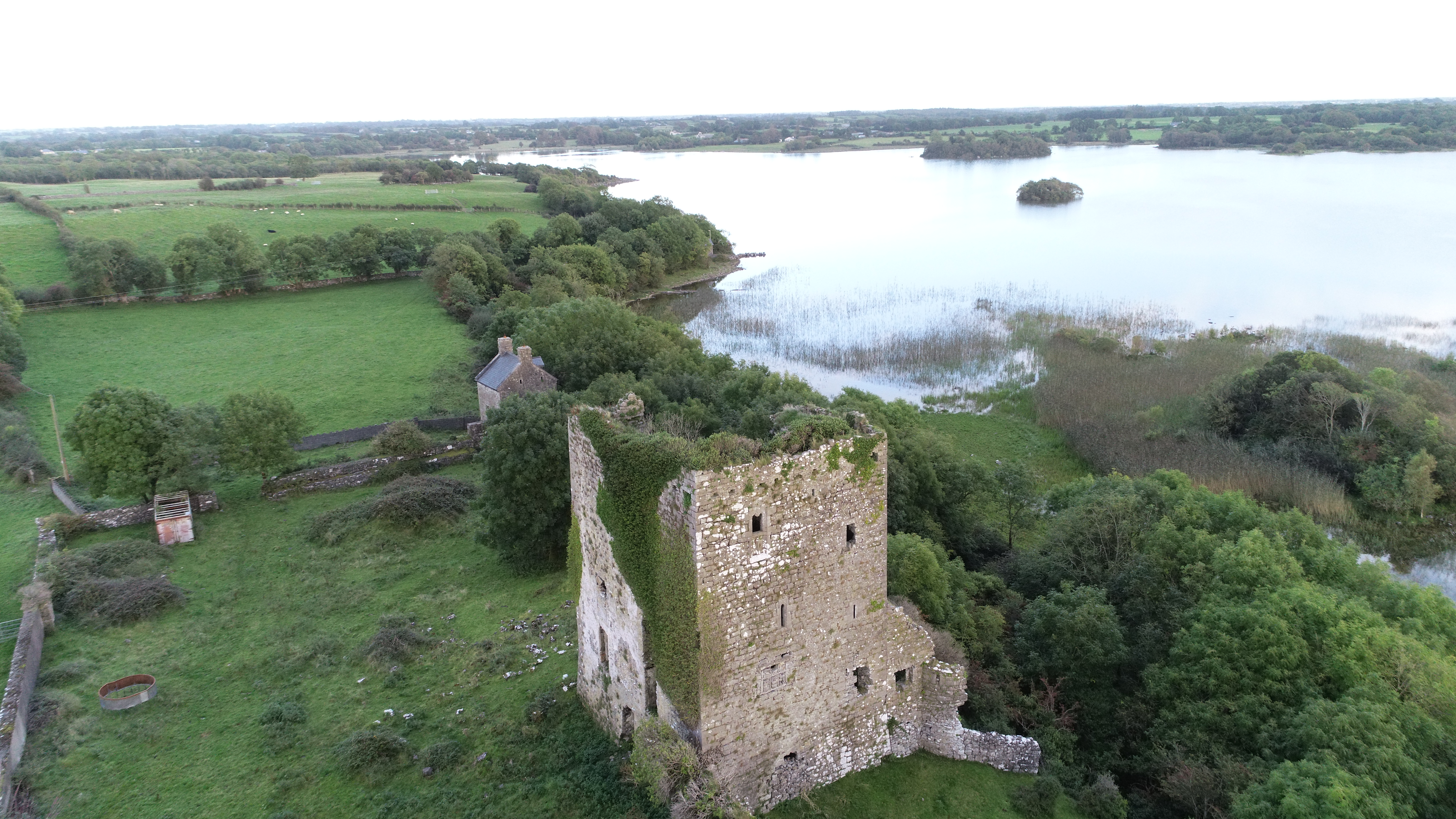
Lough Carra

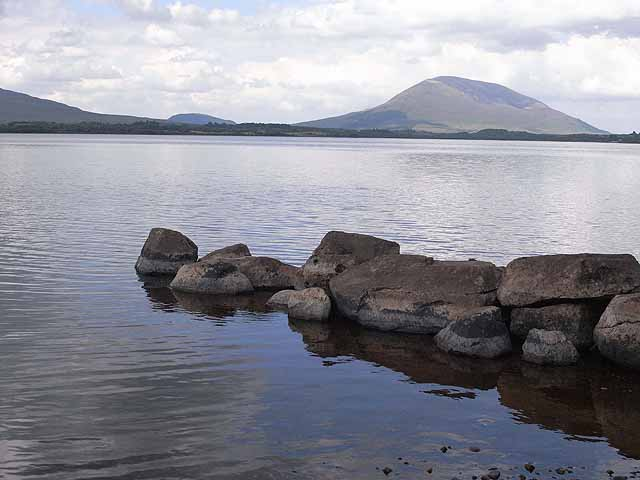
Lough Beltra

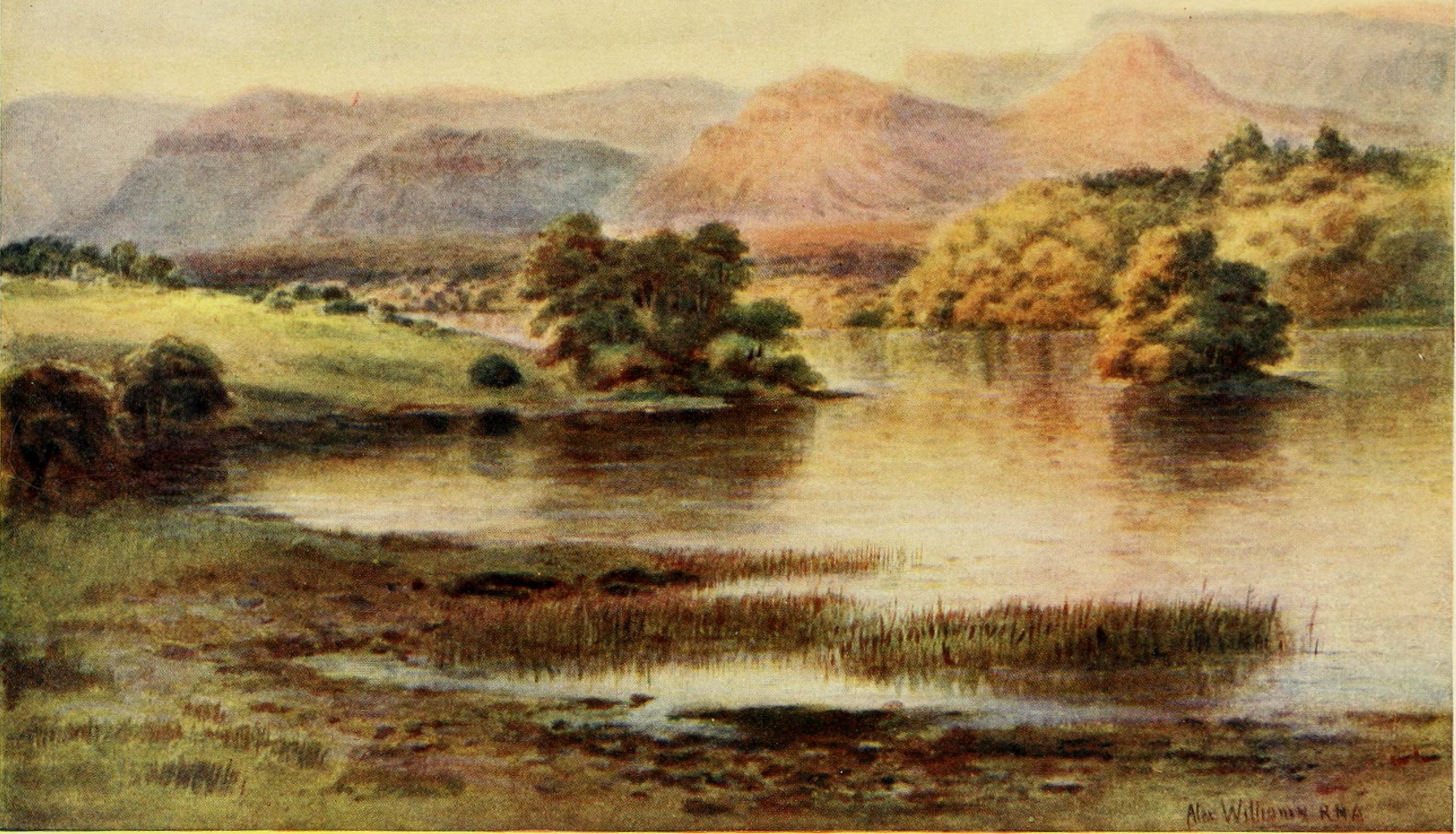
Carrowmore Lake

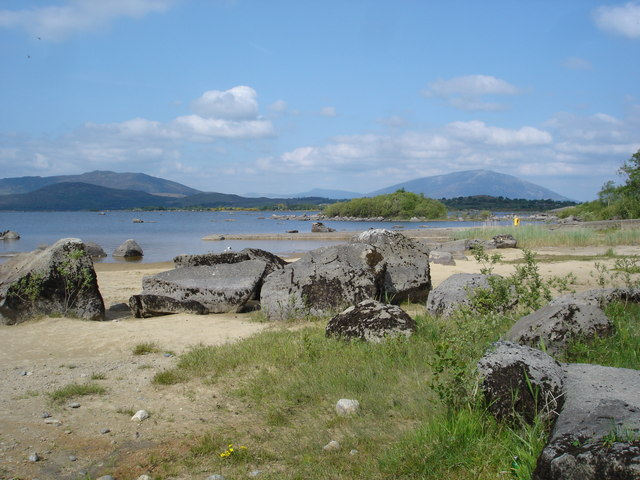
Lough Cullin

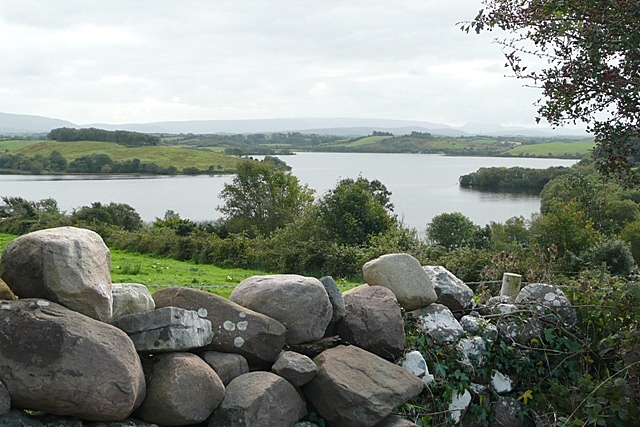
Islandeady Lough

- Note: The vast majority of Lough Mask is within County Mayo, with a small southern portion of the lough located in County Galway. This list only includes islands which are within the boundary of County Mayo.
- Aghinish
- Bed Island
- Bilberry Island
- Black Island
- Black Island
- Board Island
- Carrigeen Island
- Carrigeen Middle
- Carrigeenabreana
- Carrigeenagur Island
- Carrigeenamore
- Carrigeenavilla
- Carrigeenaweelaun
- Carrigeenbaun
- Carrigeenbunnahown
- Carrigeendany Islands
- Carrigeenduree
- Carrigeenfair Island
- Carrigeenkeelagh
- Carrigeenmauntrasna
- Carrigeennagool
- Carrigeennalogh
- Carrigeennasassonagh
- Carrigeenowen
- Carrigeenshangorman
- Castle Hag
- Cow Island
- Dash Island
- Devenish Island
- Doran Islands
- Goat Island
- Green Island
- Gull Island
- Flag Island
- Heath Island
- Illan Columbkille
- Illanboe Beg
- Illanboe More
- Illandawaur
- Ingon Island
- Inishangan
- Inishdurra
- Inishgleasty
- Inishoght
- Inishowenlackboy
- Inishrobe
- Kid Island
- Lackboy
- Lamb Island
- Long Island
- Long Islands
- Lusteen Beg
- Lusteen More
- Nut Island
- Oak Island
- Pig Island
- Rams Island
- Rialisk
- Ringolden
- River Island
- Saints Island
- Seerillaun
- Shangorman
- Shrub Island
- Thick Island
- Whiteland Island

=== Lough Carra ===
- Ballycally Island
- Bird Island
- Bonnianillish Island
- Bush Island
- Carrigeennagat Island
- Castle Island
- Castlehag Island
- Church Island
- Conors Island
- Cow Islands
- Crane Island
- Creevagh Island
- Deer Island
- Derrinrush Island
- Derrynafresha Island
- Doonbeg Island North
- Doonbeg Island South
- Gleneary Island
- Hog Island
- Horse Island
- Illanatrim
- Kiln Island
- Lady's Island
- Lakeview Island
- Leamnahye Island
- Long Island
- Mearing Island
- Otter Island
- Otter Island
- Otter Islands
- Pleasure Island
- Priest Island
- Rat Island
- Stare Island
- Stony Island

=== Lough Corrib ===
- Note: The vast majority of Lough Corrib is within County Galway, with a small northern portion of the lough located in County Mayo. This list only includes islands which are within the boundary of County Mayo.
- Abbots Rock
- Ballycurrin Island
- Bartragh Island
- Bertragh Islands
- Blackderry Island
- Blackderry Rock
- Bushy Island
- Camillaun
- Carrigeen
- Castletown Rock
- Cornelian Islands
- Crow Islands
- Dog Islands
- Easter Island
- Flower Island
- Gibbs Islands
- Grass Island
- Green Island
- Green Island East
- Holy Island
- Inishkeeragh Island
- Island Morris
- Kilmore
- Kilmorebeg
- Matthew Island
- Mine Island
- Mucky Island
- Oak Island
- Prison Islands
- Rabbit Island
- Red Island
- Salmon Island
- Salmon Point Island
- Sloe Island
- Whiskey Island

=== Lough Conn ===
- Annagh Island
- Annaghroe Island
- Annaghteige Island
- Bears Island
- Burnt Island
- Carnaweelan Island
- Castle Island
- Chain Island
- Cliff Island
- Coarse Island
- Cragh Islands
- Creeve Island
- Freaghillan
- Illanaghty
- Illanaloughaun
- Illanbeg
- Illannaglashy
- Inishlee Island
- Longford Island
- Loosky Island
- Rinard Island
- Rocky Island
- Roe Island
- Sandy Island

=== Smaller lakes ===
==== Lough Cullin ====
- Griffins Island
- Illanboy
- Illaner
- Illangub
- Illanneill
- Illanulque

==== Lough Beltra ====
- Bush Island
- Coarse Island
- Islandmore
- Low Island
- Tree Island

==== Carrowmore Lake ====
- Atlavally Island
- Derreens Island
- Gortmore Island
- Muingerroon Island

==== Furnace Lough ====
- Illanroe
- Inishower
- Saints Island

==== Islandeady Lough ====
- Note: Despite being a small lough, Islandeady had three sizeable islands, at 38, 21 and 20 acres respectively. However, due to the lowering of waterlevels in the 20th century the three islands are now peninsulas.
- Illanlteige East
- Illanteige West
- Islandeady

== Monastic islands ==
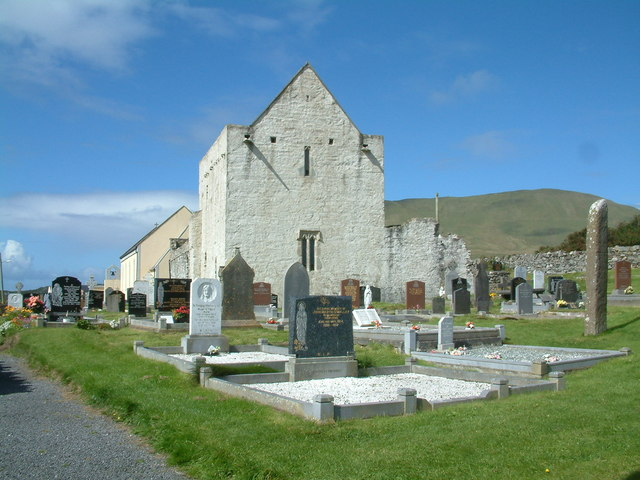
Clare Island Abbey

Six islands within County Mayo have had a dedicated monastery or abbey established on them. Four of these are offshore, and two of these are freshwater islands. They are listed below:

- Church Island Monastery (F)
- Clare Island Abbey
- Duvillaun Monastery
- Inishkea North Monastery
- Inishglora Monastery
- Partry Monastery (F)

In addition to the above sites, many more islands within the county have been used for religious purposes. The ruins of old churches and cemeteries can be found scattered across such islands.

== Biodiversity ==
Many of the county's offshore and freshwater islands are designated as areas of ecological significance and are protected both at national and European level. Mayo's offshore islands are a haven for wildlife and biodiversity, supporting hundreds of species of bird, fish and marine mammal, as well as unique vegetation. Five of the county's major inland lakes (along with their islands) are also protected, those being Lough Mask, Lough Conn, Lough Cullin, Lough Carra and Carrowmore Lake.

The biodiversity of the islands is protected under the following designations. There is overlap across designations, as different designations apply to different species, e.g. the Duvillaun Islands are an SAC, SPA and proposed NHA.

- Special Area of Conservation (SAC) - These are prime wildlife conservation areas in the country, considered to be important on a European as well as Irish level.
- Special Protection Area (SPA) - Classified under the EU Birds Directive for the protection of endangered species of wild birds.
- Natural Heritage Area (NHA) - This is an area considered important for the habitats present or which holds species of plants and animals whose habitat needs protection.

The following areas of ecological significance are located either on or adjacent to County Mayo's offshore islands. The five major inland lakes listed as SPAs are also included, and are shown in italics in the list below.

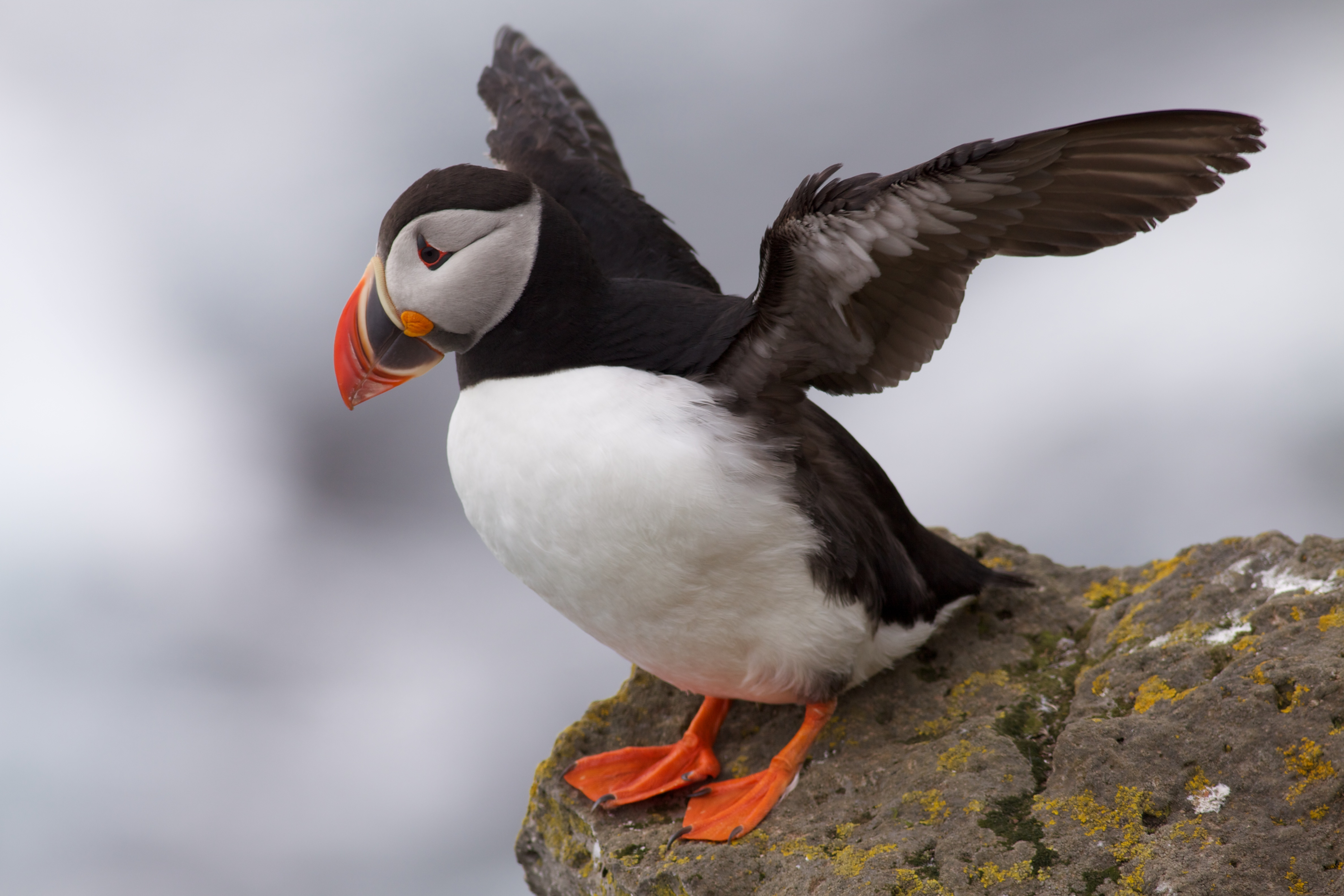
Atlantic puffin (Fratercula arctica)

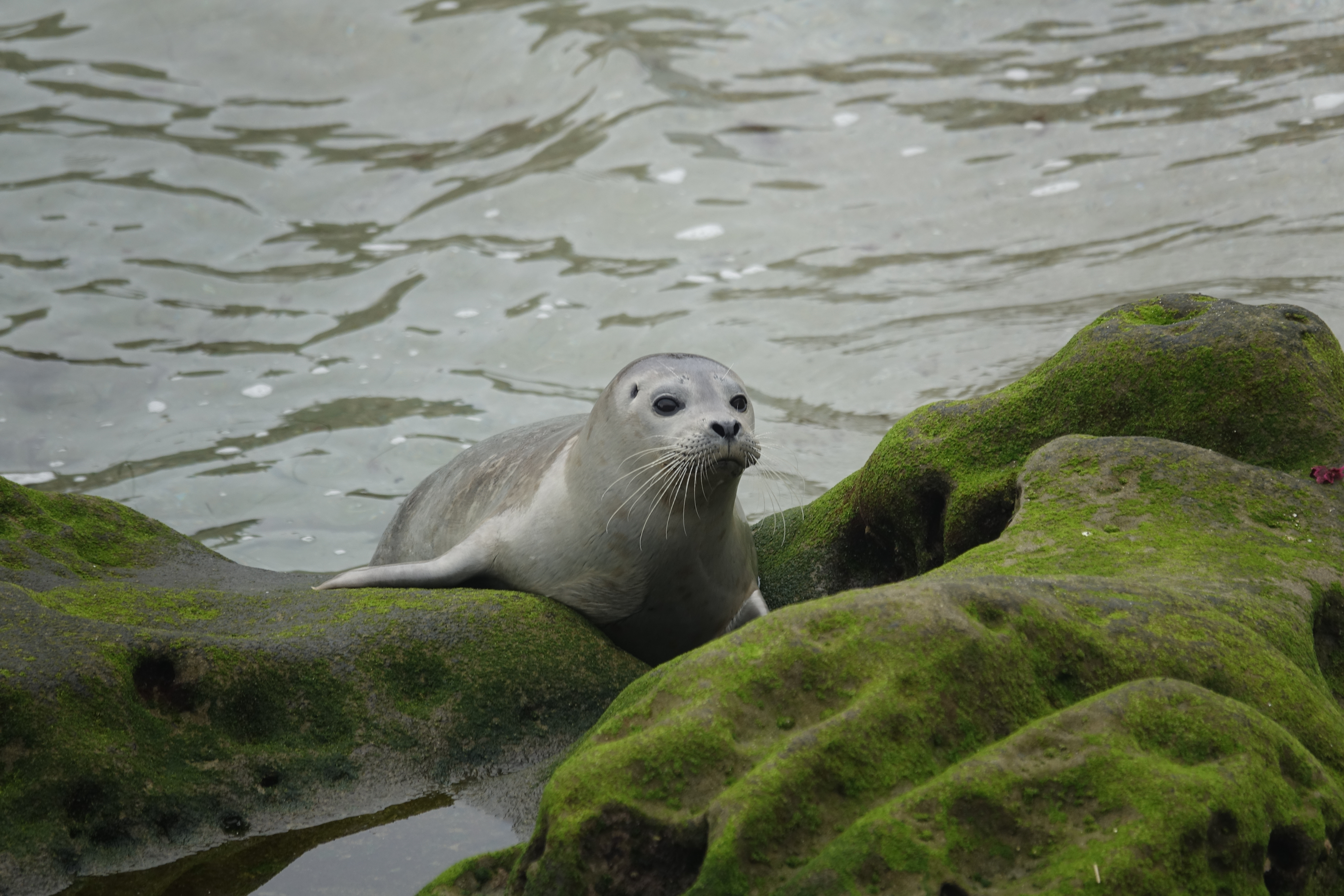
Grey seal (Halichoerus grypus)

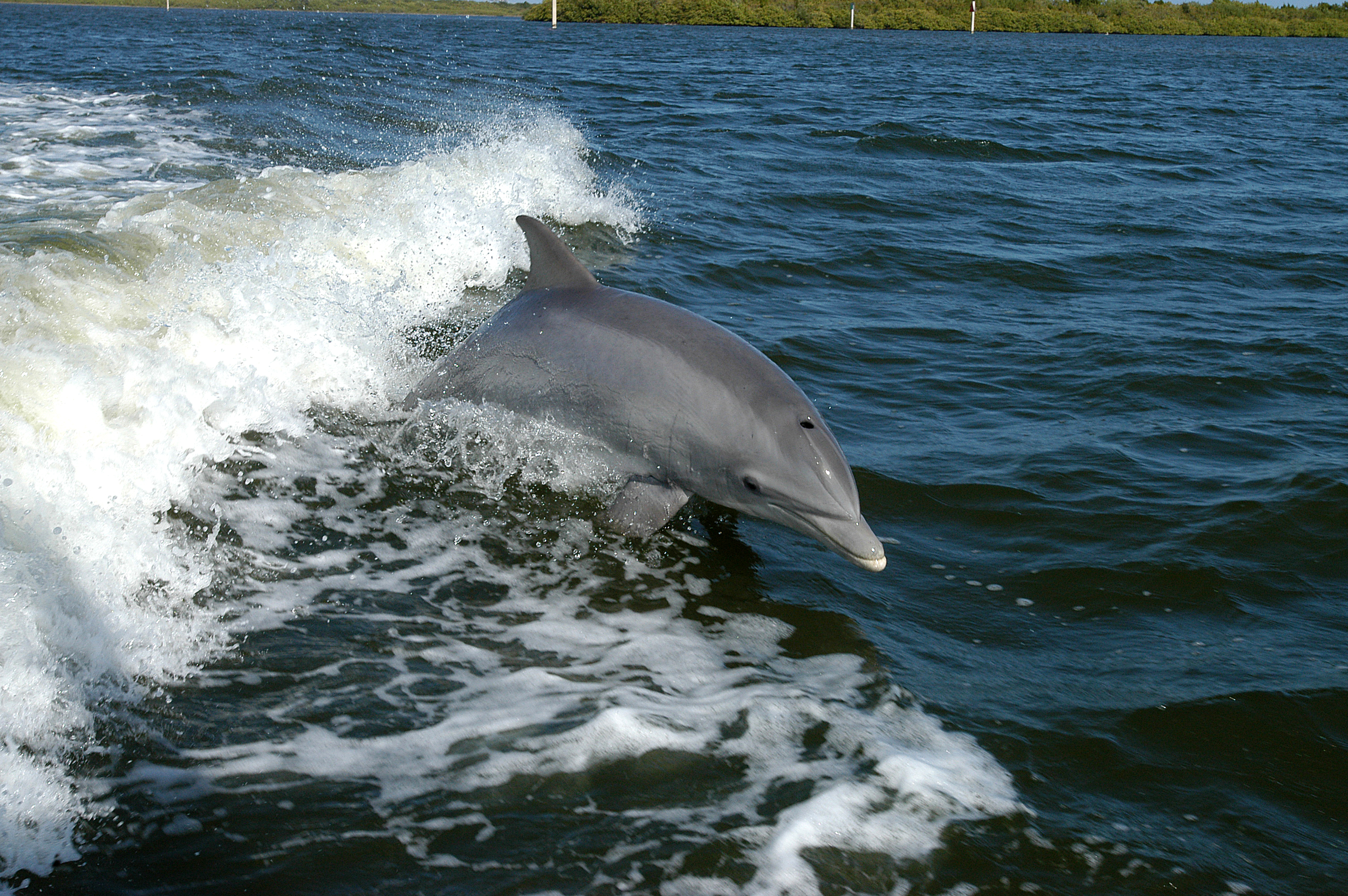
Atlantic bottlenose dolphin (Tursiops truncatus)

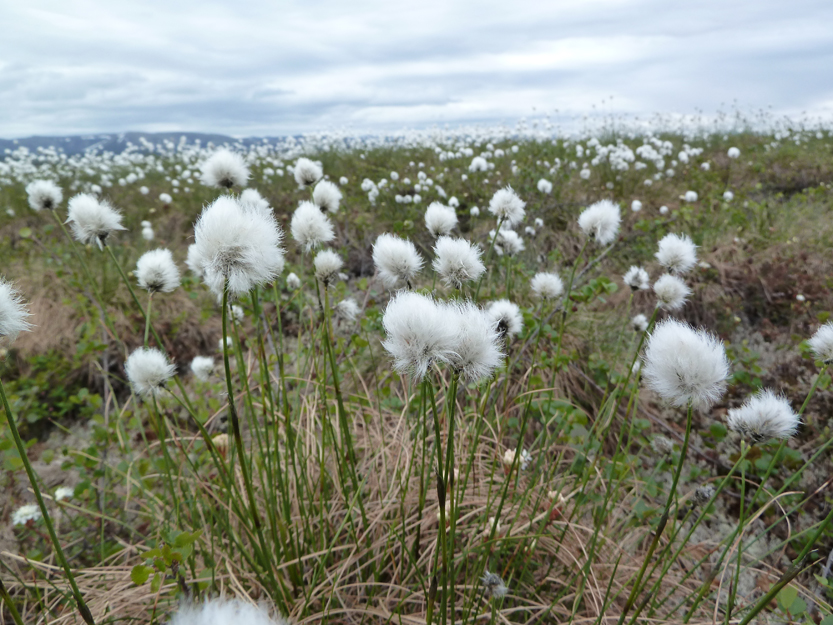
Bog cotton (Eriophorum angustifolium)

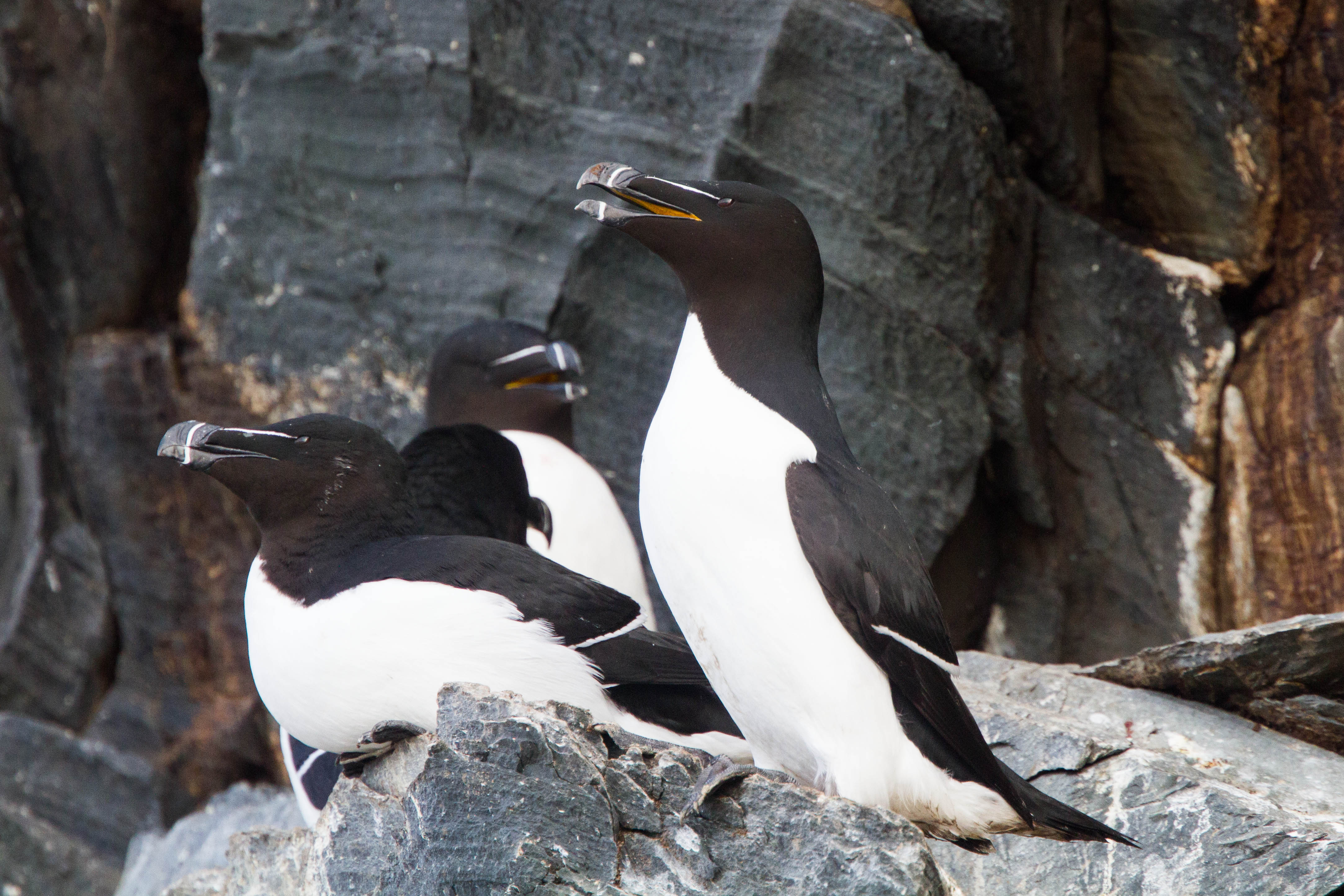
Razorbill (Alca torda)

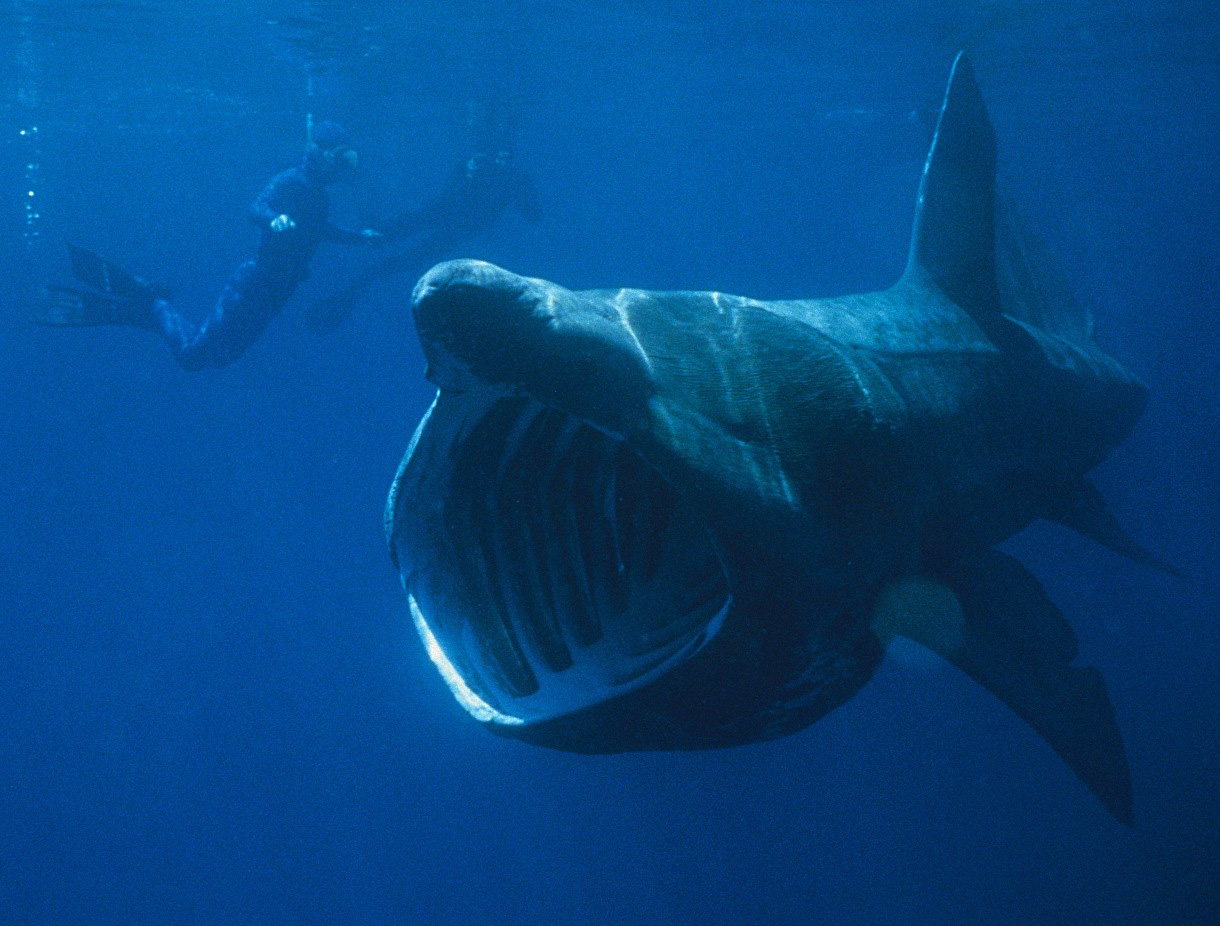
Basking shark (Cetorhinus maximus)

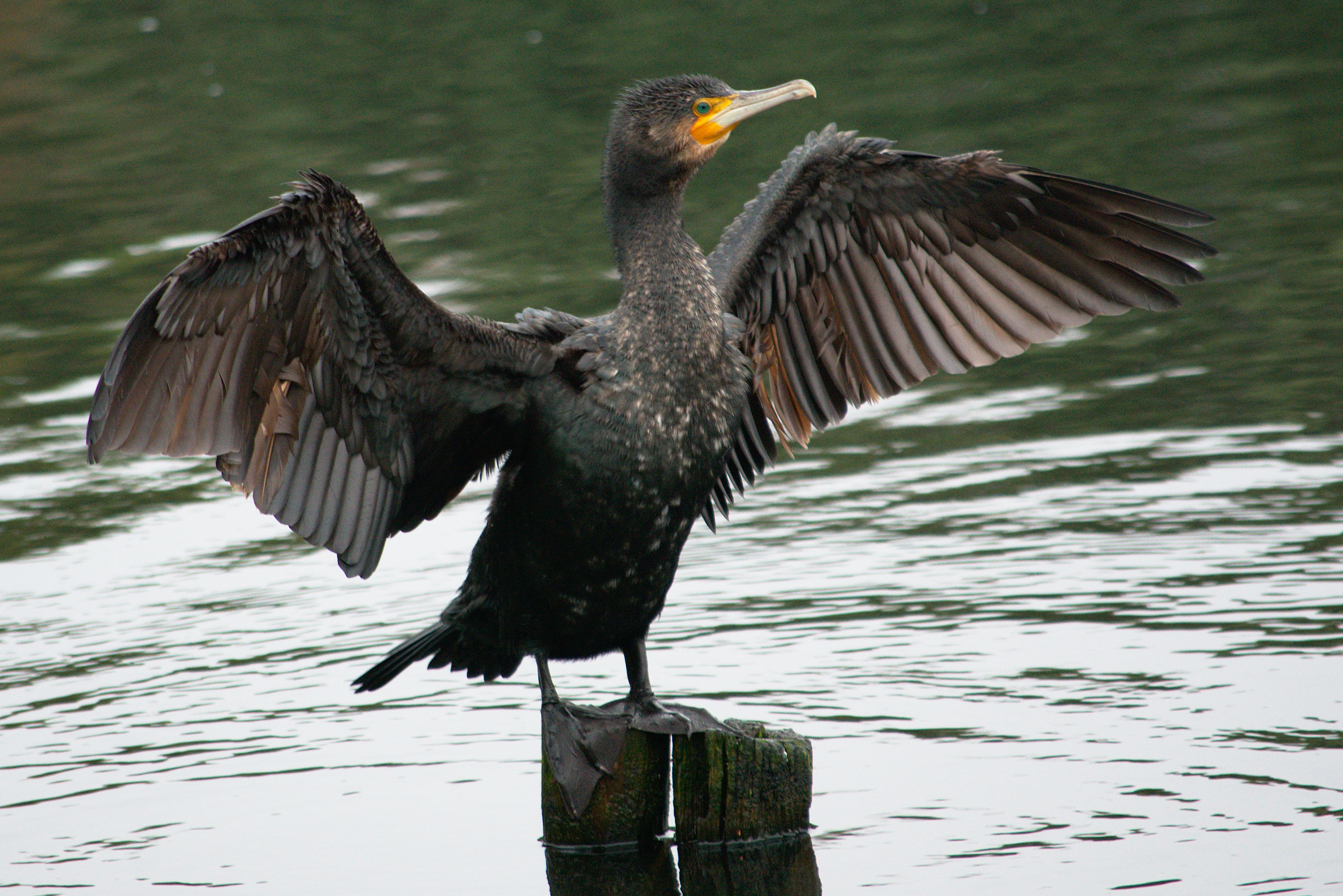
Great cormorant (Phalacrocorax carbo)

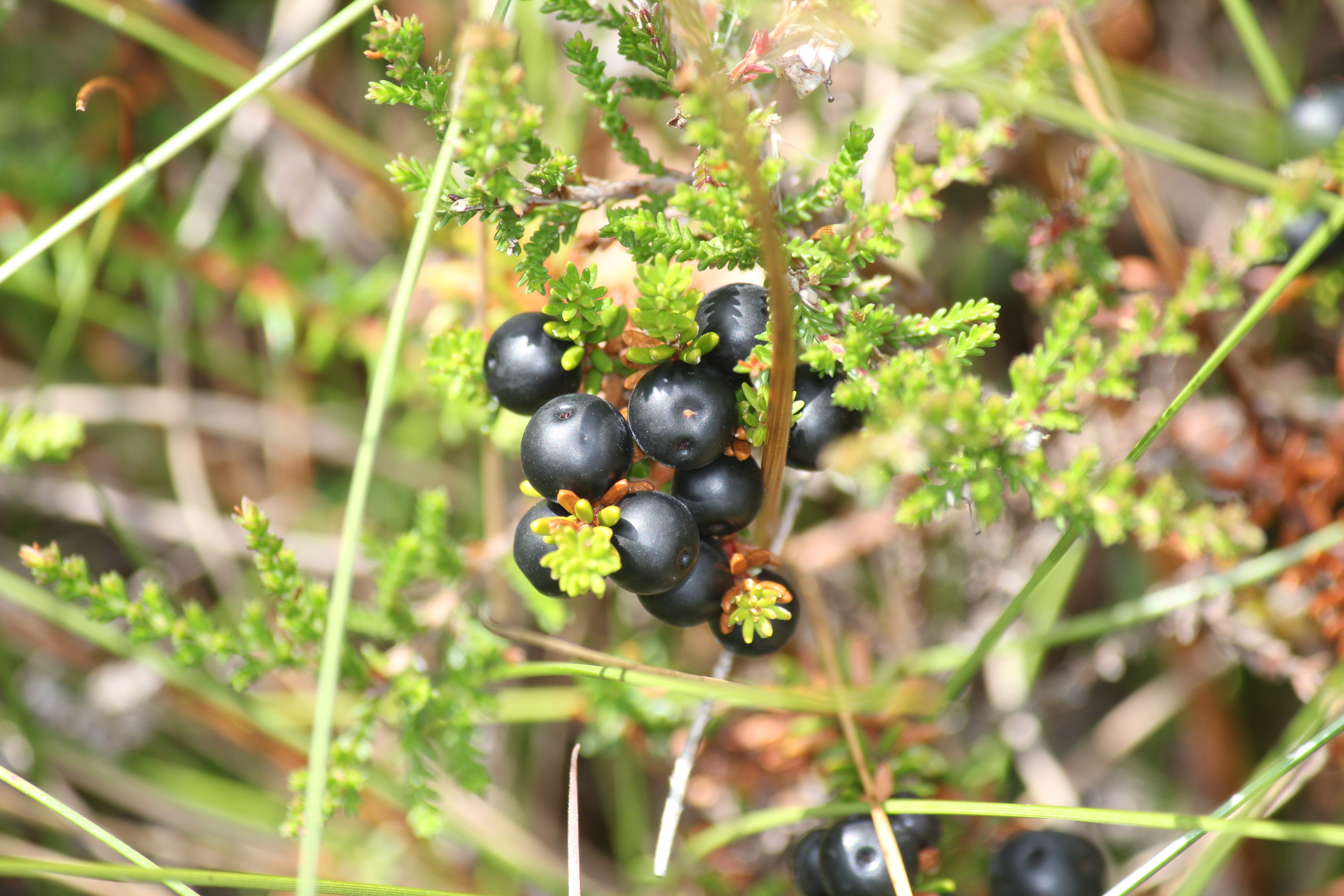
Black crowberry (Empetrum nigrum)

=== Special areas of conservation ===
- Mullet/Blacksod Bay Complex
- West Connacht Coast
- Erris Head
- Inishkea Islands
- Duvillaun Islands
- Broadhaven Bay
- Killala Bay/Moy Estuary
- Croaghaun/Slievemore
- Achill Head
- Keel Machair/Menaun Cliffs
- Doogort Machair/Lough Doo
- Clew Bay Complex
- Corraun Plateau
- Lough Gall Bog
- Clare Island Cliffs

=== Special protection areas ===
Italics indicates that the SPA is an inland lake

- Blacksod Bay/Broadhaven Bay
- Inishglora and Inishkeeragh
- Inishkea Islands
- Duvillaun Islands
- Stags of Broad Haven
- Illanmaster
- Killala Bay/Moy Estuary
- Doogort Machair
- Bills Rocks
- Clare Island
- Mullet Peninsula
- Termoncarragh Lake & Annagh Machair
- Lough Mask
- Lough Conn & Lough Cullin
- Lough Carra
- Carrowmore Lake

=== Natural heritage areas ===
- Tullaghan Bay & Bog
- Doogort East Bog
- Sraheens Bog

=== Proposed natural heritage areas ===
- Killala Bay/Moy Estuary
- Glenamoy Bog Complex
- Stags Of Broadhaven
- Broadhaven Bay
- Erris Head
- Eagle Island
- Mullet/Blacksod Bay Complex
- Inishglora & Inishkeeragh
- Inishkea Islands
- Duvillaun Islands
- Croaghaun/Slievemore
- Doogort Machair/Lough Doo
- Inishgalloon
- Keel Machair/Menaun Cliffs
- Corraun Plateau
- Lough Gall Bog
- Bills Rocks
- Clare Island
- Clew Bay Complex
- Mweelaun Island
- Caher Island
- Ballybeg Island
- Inishturk
- Inishdalla
- Frehill Island
- Inishdegil Islands

== Island index ==
Achill Island

Clare Island

Inishturk

Inishkea North

Inishkea South

Achillbeg

Annagh Island

Caher Island

Barranagh Island

Inishbiggle

Eagle Island

Inishglora

== See also ==
- List of loughs of County Mayo
- List of mountains and hills of County Mayo
