= Nadim Sadek =

- Born: 1962
- Occupations: Businessperson, author
- Website: https://www.nadimsadek.com/

Nadim Sadek (born October 1962) is an Irish-Egyptian marketing entrepreneur and author based in London in the United Kingdom. He is the founder and CEO of a company which uses artificial intelligence to provide automated advertising for book publishers. He previously founded a qualitative research firm and a brand management company.

== Early life and education ==
Sadek is Irish-Egyptian. He was born to an Egyptian father, who worked as a statistician and an epidemiologist for the World Health Organisation, and an Irish mother. As a child, he lived in countries in Africa (including Kenya and Ghana), Asia and Europe. Sadek studied psychology at Trinity College in Dublin.

== Career ==
After college, Sadek started his career in market research. In 1985, he started working at Lansdowne Market Research in Dublin. After moving to London in 1986, Sadek became a director of Burns Research Partners, renamed Burns Sadek Research two years later, a qualitative research company. After seven years there, he founded Sadek Wynberg Research (SWR) in Kensington in 1993. SWR conducted research for the development of brands and communications for companies such as Unilever, Kimberly-Clark, Vodafone and Sony Ericsson. Sadek Wynberg Research became the UK's largest qualitative agency before its acquisition by WPP in 2003. After acquisition, the company became Sadek Wynberg Millward Brown.

In 2011, Sadek appeared in the RTÉ version of the TV show Secret Millionaire.

After the sale of his company, SWS, Sadek founded the Inish Turk Beg brand on the Irish island of Inish Turk Beg, which he owned from 2003 to 2013. Sadek founded the brand management consultancy TransgressiveX in 2012, but didn't launch the company until 2015. It was rebranded as ProQuo AI in 2019 and sold to Grafton Capital in 2022.

In 2023, Sadek founded Shimmr AI, a company using artificial intelligence to provide automated advertising for book publishers. In late 2023, the company raised funding from a group of investors including former executives of M&C Saatchi. In September 2023, Sadek submitted written evidence to the House of Lords Communications and Digital Committee during its 2023 inquiry into large language models. Also in 2023, Sadek published a book titled Shimmer, don't Shake - how Publishing can embrace AI.

Sadek has spoken at a number of events, including at the Bologna Children's Book Fair in 2025 and 2026, at the Oxford Union, the London Book Fair, the Frankfurt Book Fair, and the National Film and Television School.

== Personal life ==
Sadek, who is married with four children, lives in London. He manages the music career of his daughter, the recording artist Shaefri, through his label Off The Record.
