= Clynish =

Island in County Mayo, Ireland

Coordinates: 53.844°N 9.637°W

Clynish (Gaeilge: Claínis) is an inhabited intensively farmed island in Clew Bay, County Mayo, Ireland.

== Demographics ==
Historical population

Year	Pop.	±%
1841	87	—
1851	64	−26.4%
1861	24	−62.5%
1871	20	−16.7%
1881	17	−15.0%
1891	30	+76.5%
1901	30	+0.0%
1911	23	−23.3%
1926	18	−21.7%

Year	Pop.	±%
1936	18	+0.0%
1946	12	−33.3%
1951	7	−41.7%
1956	6	−14.3%
1961	5	−16.7%
1966	4	−20.0%
1971	4	+0.0%
1979	4	+0.0%
1981	4	+0.0%

Year	Pop.	±%
1986	3	−25.0%
1991	5	+66.7%
1996	5	+0.0%
2002	5	+0.0%
2006	5	+0.0%
2011	4	−20.0%
2016	4	+0.0%
2022	3	−25.0%

Source: Central Statistics Office. "CNA17: Population by Off Shore Island, Sex and Year". CSO.ie.
