= Inishdalla =

Island off Mayo coast, Ireland

Native name: Inis Deala
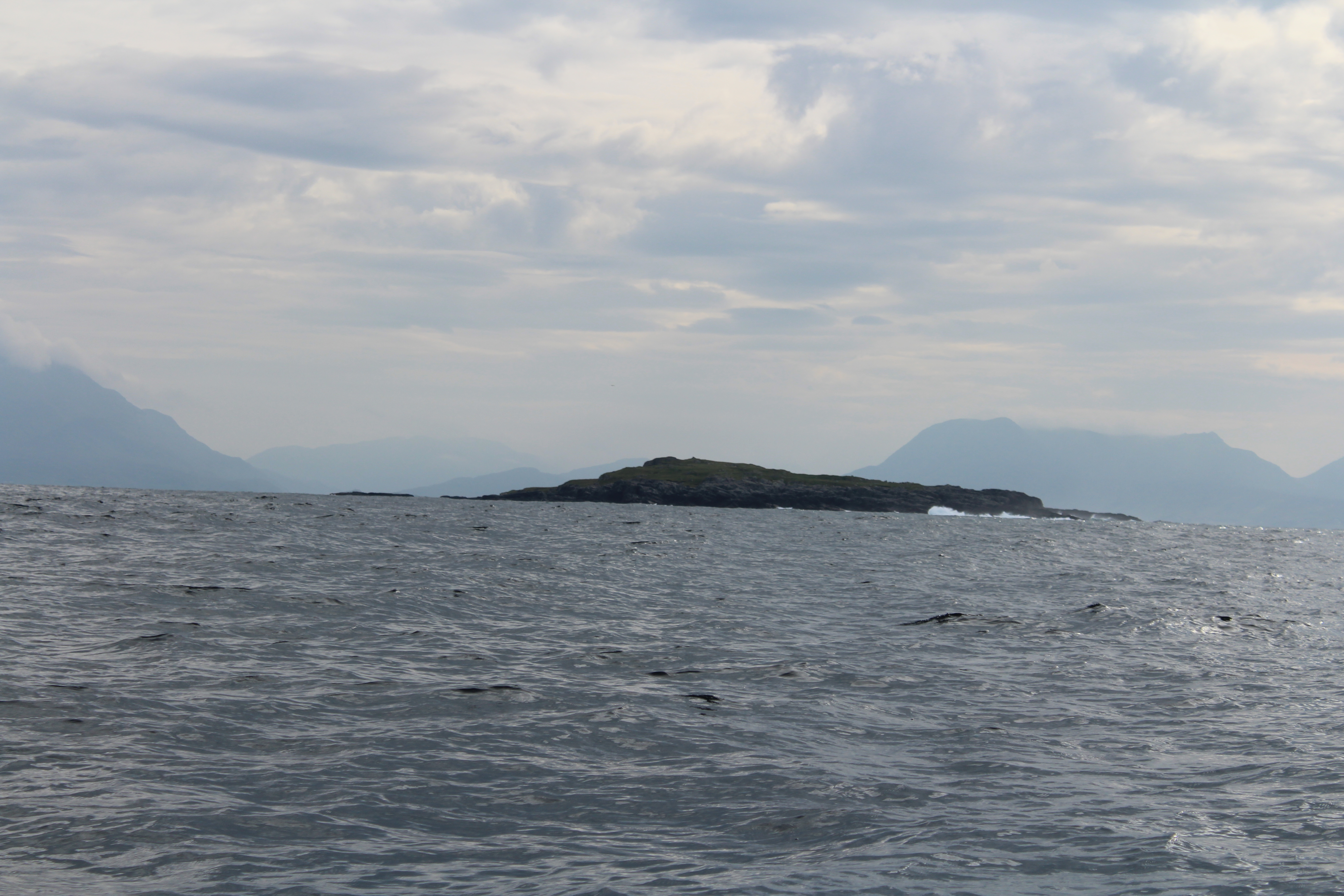
- Inishdalla

- Location within island of Ireland

Geography
- Location: Atlantic Ocean
- Coordinates: 53.6805556°N 10.0716667°W
- Area: 0.1396 km^{2} (0.0539 sq mi)

Administration
- Ireland
- Province: Connacht
- County: Mayo

Demographics
- Population: 0 (2016)

Inishdalla (Gaeilge: Inis Deala) is a small uninhabited island in County Mayo located to the south east of Inishturk, Ireland.
