= Inish Turk Beg =

Private island in Ireland

Native name: Inis Toirc Beag
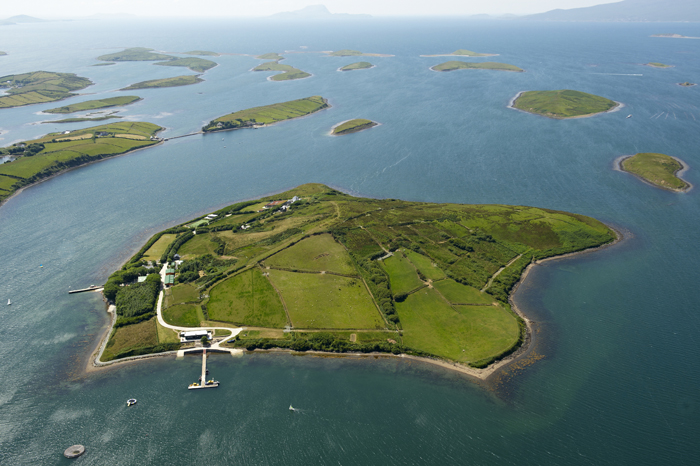

- Location within island of Ireland

Geography
- Location: Atlantic Ocean (Clew Bay)
- Coordinates: 53°51′22.36″N 9°36′38.93″W

Administration
- Ireland
- Province: Connacht
- County: Mayo

Inish Turk Beg (from Irish Inis Toirc Beag, meaning 'small island of the wild boar') is a private island in Clew Bay, County Mayo on the west coast of Ireland. Between 2003 and 2013, it was owned by Nadim Sadek, an Irish-Egyptian marketing entrepreneur. The island is approximately 10 km (6.2 mi) by road from the towns of Newport and Westport, County Mayo, and 67 km (42 mi) from Ireland West Airport.

== Geography ==
Inish Turk Beg is one of the largest islands in Clew Bay. The holy mountain of Croagh Patrick stands to the south of the bay. To the north is the Nephin Beg mountain range. In the east are the County Mayo towns of Newport and Westport. To the west is Clare Island: the largest island in Clew Bay.

== History ==
On the west coast of Ireland, islands are often known by what could once be found on them (Inishbofin, for example, is "island of the white cow"). Historically the island's economy has been based on agriculture and the cultivation of livestock such as sheep, pigs, cattle, and potatoes. The raised potato rill (or drill) gives the land around Inish Turk Beg's landscape a recognisable "rippled" appearance. Inish Turk Beg was also once host to a number of boat-builders.

In 2003, the island was purchased by Nadim Sadek. Over the next decade, the entrepreneur invested in infrastructure including roads, jetties, sewage systems and utility buildings. He also used the island to launch a variety of business ventures including hospitality, smoked fish range, music recording, a Connemara Pony Stud, art residencies and a malt whiskey. In 2013, Sadek sold the island for €4,000,000 but kept the intellectual property rights to the business he established.
