= Inishcottle =

Island in County Mayo, Ireland

Coordinates: 53.853°N 9.629°W

Inishcottle (Gaeilge: Inis Coitil) is an inhabited island in Clew Bay, County Mayo, Ireland.

== Demographics ==
Historical population

Year	Pop.	±%
1841	40	—
1851	36	−10.0%
1861	38	+5.6%
1871	42	+10.5%
1881	29	−31.0%
1891	16	−44.8%
1901	27	+68.8%
1911	45	+66.7%
1926	30	−33.3%

Year	Pop.	±%
1936	18	−40.0%
1946	13	−27.8%
1951	11	−15.4%
1956	9	−18.2%
1961	10	+11.1%
1966	9	−10.0%
1971	8	−11.1%
1979	11	+37.5%
1981	11	+0.0%

Year	Pop.	±%
1986	10	−9.1%
1991	10	+0.0%
1996	7	−30.0%
2002	4	−42.9%
2006	3	−25.0%
2011	5	+66.7%
2016	0	−100.0%
2022	3	—

Source: Central Statistics Office. "CNA17: Population by Off Shore Island, Sex and Year". CSO.ie.
