= Li Ji Slays the Giant Serpent =

Chinese tale

- Traditional Chinese: 《李寄斬蛇》
- Simplified Chinese: 《李寄斩蛇》
- Literal meaning: Li Ji Killing a Snake
Transcriptions
Standard Mandarin
- Hanyu Pinyin: Lǐ Jì Zhǎn Shé
- Wade–Giles: Li Chi Chan Shê

Li Ji Slays the Giant Serpent, also known by its Chinese name Li Ji Zhan She and by many other names, is a Chinese tale first published in the 4th-century compilation Soushen Ji attributed to the Jin-dynasty official Gan Bao (or Kan Pao). The story concerns a young heroine named Li Ji who bravely rids her village of a terrible snake.

== Names ==
Alternate English names for the tale are: "The Girl-Eating Serpent"; "Li Chi Slays the Serpent"; "Li Ji Slays the Great Serpent"; "Li Ji Hacks Down the Snake"; "Li Chi Slays the Great Serpent"; "Li Chi, the Serpent Slayer"; "Li Ji, the Serpent Slayer"; and "The Serpent Sacrifice".

== Synopsis ==
The story is set in Jiangle County (Chiang-lo), Minzhong Commandery, Eastern Yue (or Dongyue) Kingdom, when southeastern China was still fragmented into small kingdoms and territories. In the Yong (Yung) mountains there lived a serpent that "demanded" (through people's dreams and wu shamans) the sacrifice of maidens from the village below. The town officials, afraid of the creature, give in to its horrible requests and send the daughters of slaves and criminals to the cave's opening. These sacrifices repeat eight more times, always during "the first week of the eighth lunar month".

One day, Li Ji (or Li Chi), the youngest daughter of Li Dan (or Li Tan), offers herself to be the sacrifice, since her mother and father have five other daughters and no son.

She goes to the mountains to face the serpent, armed with a sword and accompanied by a snake-biting dog. Li Ji puts a basket of sweet-smelling rice cakes to draw the serpent out of its hideout, and while it is distracted by the food, unleashes the dog on the animal. The serpent retreats to the cave, but the girl follows after it, always hitting and striking its body with the sword, until it dies. Li Ji sees the skeletons of the nine sacrificed maidens and laments they were devoured by the beast because of fear.

The King of Dongyue learns of Li Ji's bravery and marries her. Her father also becomes the Magistrate of Jiangle.

== Analysis ==
=== Tale type ===
Chinese folklorist and scholar Ting Nai-tung established a second typological classification of Chinese folktales (the first was by Wolfram Eberhard in the 1930s). In his new system, he indexed the story of Li Ji as the Chinese type 300, "The Dragon-Slayer". Ting's type corresponds, in the international Aarne-Thompson-Uther Index, to tale type ATU 300, "The Dragon-Slayer": the hero fights against a dragon with the help of his dogs in order to rescue a maiden offered as a sacrifice.

=== Interpretations ===
The tale shares similarities with tales about dragonslaying around the globe. However, in this tale, a serpent takes the place of the dragon.

Some scholars interpret the tale as a contrast of Li Ji's bravery against the ineffectualness of the male village officers, who preferred to obey the serpent instead of trying to fight it.

The tale has also been interpreted under an anthropological lens: the snake would be linked to female sexuality and fertility.

It has also been suggested that the snake foe (a python with supernatural powers, in some accounts) may represent an old local deity with serpentine form, and the sacrifice of virginal maidens merits comparison to fertility rites. As a new belief system was being diffused through the country, the old animal-shaped divinities were subject to a process of religious reformation that demoted them to adversarial roles of the newcomer human-like deities. In the same vein, the tale could be related to a phenomenon researcher Wu Chunming named "suppression of the snake", brought about by "Sinnitic immigrants to the region".

Hugh R. Clark also identifies the tale as belonging to traditions from "the Min River valley" and, by extension, reflective of the Yue culture. Similarly, ancient Chinese scholars once associated the culture of Min with snakes, which is further reinforced by the fact that folktales collected in Fujian show snakes as vicious enemies to be vanquished.

Professor Biwu Shang also cites another tale about serpent-slaying, “The Great Serpent”. According to him, in this tale of the zhiguai genre, a similarly named heroine Li Ji slays a human-killing serpent.

== See also ==
- Dragonslayer (heroic archetype in fiction)
- Han E & Hua Mulan, Chinese women warriors
- List of women warriors in folklore
- Susanoo, slayer of eight-headed serpent Yamata no Orochi
- Nezha, opponent of Dragon Prince Ao Bing
- Chen Jinggu, slayer of the White Snake Demon; as well as The Divine Damsel of Devastation, a song inspired by Chen Jinggu and Li Ji's stories in Genshin Impact
- Sitonai, similar Ainu legend
