= Sitonai =

Legendary Ainu heroine

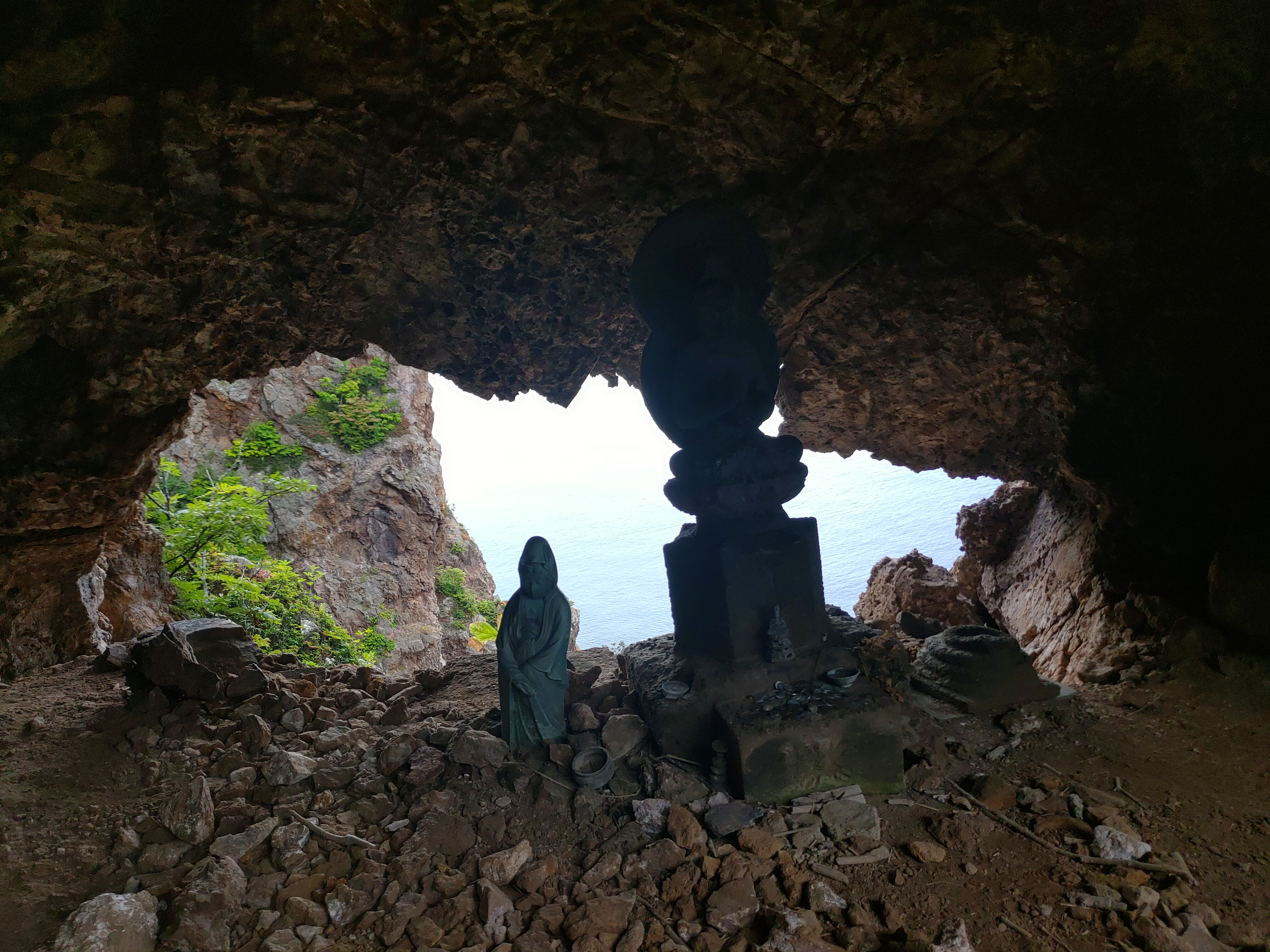
Hakuryu cave in Akaiwa mountain

Sitonai (Ainu: シトナイ) is a mythical Ainu heroine, known for a legend of slaying a giant snake of Akaiwa mountain (located northwest to Otaru).

== Synopsis ==
In a cave in Akaiwa mountain there lived a giant serpent (the height of the body was seven or eight go (22.3 meters), and the thickness of the body was about the size of a four-toed barrel) that demanded the sacrifice of maidens from the village below, once a year on the 15th day of the eighth month. The town officials, afraid of the creature, give in to its horrible requests and send a maiden to the cave's opening.

On the tenth year after nine years of sacrificing children, the youngest of six daughters of the village chief, Sitonai, aged 12 or 13, volunteers to be next sacrifice. In other version she is the 9th sacrifice, the youngest of nine daughters and aged 15.

Sitonai goes to the cave with a makiri knife and her faithful hunting dog, and along the way they hunt a deer and a bear and acquire their meat. She then sets a trap for the snake by leaving the meat out in front of its den as bait, and waits hidden for the snake to exit its cave. When the snake comes out under the light of the full moon, it sees the bear and deer carcasses and begins to swallow them, but it digests it slowly. While its mouth is stuffed with bear and working on the deer, Sitonai orders her dog to attack, and it savagely bites into serpent's otherwise occupied throat, fighting with it until it stops moving, at which time Sitonai takes her makiri and finishes it off. In one version, she delivers a "perfect" finishing strike. She then enters the cave and gathers the remains of all the previous sacrifices for burial while lamenting on how the girls before her were all so weak that they were eaten by what proved to be just a mere snake, and she and the dog return to the village with the gathered bones.

From this time on, a peaceful life came to the village, but for fear of haunting, local people decided to celebrate and enshrine the Hakuryu Daigongen (白龍大権現, White Dragon Great Gongen) in this cave. The Akaiwa mountain shrine was also linked with a legend of sighting of a white dragon rising to the heavens when a Shugendo monk practiced in a cave at the beginning of the Meiji era.

There are two main versions of the Sitonai legend (one of her being a 12/13 year old 10th sacrifice and other a 15yo 9th). One of the first records of the former version comes from the newspaper reporter Aoki Junji (青木純二) and of the latter from a local historian Hashimoto Gyou/Takashi (橋本堯尚). Aoki's version is told by: アイヌの伝説と其情話 (Ainu no densetsu to sono jōwa), 北海道の口碑伝説 (Hokkaidō no kōhi densetsu), 北海道昔ばなし (Hokkaidō mukashibanashi), 伝説は生きている: 写真で見る北海道の口承文芸 (Densetsu wa ikiteiru: Shashin de miru hokkaidō no kōshō bungei). Hashimoto's version appears in: 北海道郷土史研究 (Hokkaidō kyōdoshi kenkyū), 昔話北海道 (Mukashibanashi Hokkaido), 少年少女日本伝説全集1, コタンの大蛇：小人のコロボックルほか(Kotan no Orochi).

== Analysis ==
The tale shares similarities with tales about dragon-slaying around the globe. However, in this tale, a serpent takes the place of the dragon. It also resembles a Japanese legend of Susanoo and Yamata no Orochi, except in the Ainu version it is a girl sacrifice that does the killing, not a male outsider. The legend of Sitonai, especially Aoki's version, also bears many similarities to the Chinese story Li Ji slays the Giant Serpent of a similar dragon sacrifice girl called Li Ji, up to the creature being a serpent, eight month being specified, and the number of offerings. The offerings for a dragon/snake create merit comparison to rites of rain-making, closely related to the belief in dragon and snake gods, frequent in Hokkaido and having a history of being practiced in various places of Japan starting from the description in the Nihon Shoki (日本書紀).

== Popular culture ==
Sitonai is a summonable Servant in the mobile game Fate/Grand Order. She is an Alter Ego-class Servant summoned into the body of Illyasviel von Einzbern, a character from the cast of Fate/stay night and so due to the Alter Ego-class being an amalgam of Divine Spirits, she is combined with the goddesses Louhi and Freyja.

== See also ==
- Dragonslayer (heroic archetype in fiction)
- Benzaiten, slayer of serpent Vrtra
- List of women warriors in folklore
- Susanoo, slayer of eight-headed serpent Yamata no Orochi
- Nezha, opponent of Dragon Prince Ao Bing
- Chen Jinggu, slayer of the White Snake Demon
