= Chen Jinggu =

Chinese goddess and Confucian and Daoist deity

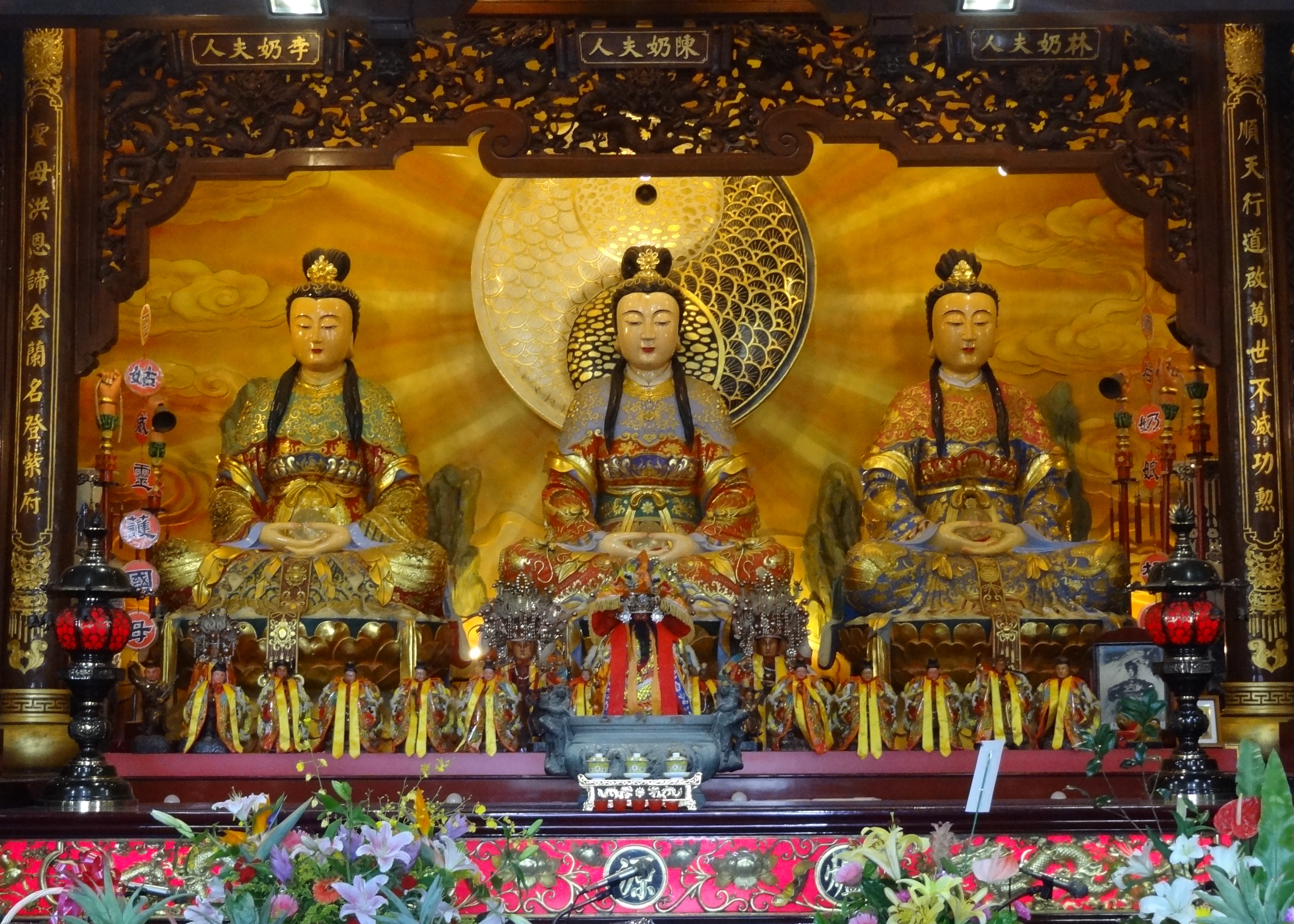
- Statue of Goddess Chen Jinggu with Lin Jiuniang and Li Sannai in LuyuanTemple (爐源寺 羅東) of Luodong Taiwan
- Traditional Chinese: 臨水夫人
- Simplified Chinese: 临水夫人
Transcriptions
Standard Mandarin
- Hanyu Pinyin: Lín Shuǐ Fū Rén
- Bopomofo: ㄌㄧㄣˊ ㄕㄨㄟˇ ㄈㄨ ㄖㄣˊ
Wu
- Romanization: lin sr fu nyin
Southern Min
- Hokkien POJ: Lîm chúi hu-jîn
- Tâi-lô: Lîm tsuí hu-jîn
Eastern Min
- Fuzhou BUC: Lìng cūi hŭ-ìng

Chen Jinggu (simplified Chinese: 陈靖姑; traditional Chinese: 陳靖姑; pinyin: Chén Jìnggū) is a Chinese a historical protective goddess of women, children, and pregnancy, and is believed by her worshippers to be a former Taoist priestess. She is also known as Lady Linshui (臨水夫人 Linshui furen).

Chen Jinggu is a historical figure and deity worshipped in Fujian, Taiwan, South China, and across East and Southeast Asia. The legend of Chen Jinggu originated in Fuzhou prefecture. She was also a Taoist priestess of the Lushan School (閭山派). She was virtuous and was worshipped as a goddess after her death. She was acquainted in mediumship or spirit channeling.

Taiwan has more than 130 temples dedicated to Chen, and Fujian has many ancestral temples dedicated to her as well. Today, she is revered as a Taoist and Confucian deity.

== Name ==
The goddess is also nicknamed Madam Chen.

== History ==
Chen Jinggu was a historical Taoist figure who was born Chen Jing (陳靖) and was called Chen Jinggu (陈靖姑). She was born in Xiadu (下渡), and miraculously she was born with supernatural powers in Fuzhou, nowadays Cangshan District, around 766 CE. One source claims she was born in the 2nd year of Dali during the Tang dynasty. Another source says she was born at the end of the Tang dynasty and died in the 5th year of Tiancheng in the Later Tang dynasty. When young, Chen Jinggu went to the Lushan school (or Mount Lü, said to be located in modern Jiangxi) with Lin Jiuniang and Li Sanniang to study under Xu Xun (许逊). But even at Lushan, Chen learned all about Taoism except the traditional female roles of maternity, pregnancy, etc.

After finishing her studies, she returned home and married Liu Qi (劉杞) from Gutian County, Ningde. She continued to subdue spirits and help those in need. At the age of 24, Chen Jinggu became pregnant, but she continued to help the people through rain or drought. A drought hit north Fujian, so she used her Taoist powers to create rain but eventually sacrificed her fetus and herself to save the people and vanquish an evil snake demon. She was honored as a deity by the people and was bestowed the honorary title Linshui, the goddess who protects the fetus and pregnant women (順產助生護胎佑民女神).

It is said that one of the goddesses (懿德夫人 Madame Yide) of Ryukyu Islands is a disciple of Chen Jinggu.

Chen Jinggu, Lin Jiuniang, and Li Sanniang were sworn sisters (義結金蘭 Yijie Jinlan). Chen Jinggu was the head and was called Danai Furen (大奶夫人) or Chen Nai Furen (陳奶夫人). Lin Jiuniang was called Lin Nai Furen (林奶夫人) or Lin Ernai (林二奶 second lady Lin). Li Sanniang was called Li Nai Furen (李奶夫人) or Li Sannai (李三奶 third lady Li). Chen, Lin, and Li are sometimes referred to as the "Three Ladies".

== Stories ==
The novel "Chen Jinggu pacifies Demons" or "The Lady of Linshui pacifies Demons" (Linshui pingyao 临水平妖) was written in the 17th century around the Ming-Qing period. However, some date the book even earlier, to the 15th century. The tale is based on Chen Jinggu, who was born during the Tang, and the legend of Chen was told during the Song.

In the novel, Chen Jinggu refused an arranged marriage and ran away from home to study Daoism and shamanism in Lushan. After returning home, she married and became pregnant. But she had to confront a white demon snake and save her home, the Min Kingdom, from drought. She cast a spell to make it rain, but had to sacrifice her child (the fetus) and hide it so it would not be harmed by the spell. However, the demon snake ate the fetus, but Chen Jinggu battled and defeated the demon snake, thereby saving the kingdom.

It is noted that Chen Jinggu essentially performed abortion on herself to save her people.

The story was translated into French by Brigitte Baptandier and published in 1988 under the title "La Dame-du-bord-de-l'eau". Later, in 2008, it was translated into English with the help of Baptandier in a book published by Stanford University Press.

=== Analysis ===
Scholars have analyzed the book based on the reversal of gender norms and the woman's role in society. They note that Chen Jinggu initially eschewed the traditional role of women. First, she refused an arranged marriage. Moreover, rather than giving birth to her child, she chose instead to sacrifice her fetus in order to save her country. Scholars also analyze the book in terms of the challenges that women may face when trying to become leaders in society, or in Chen Jinggu's case, becoming a Daoist leader.

== Guanyin ==
Chen Jinggu is said to be related to Guanyin via the following story. One day in Quanzhou, Fujian, the people needed money to build a bridge. Guanyin turned into an attractive lady and said she would marry any man who could hit her with silver. Many tried, and Guanyin was able to accumulate a lot of silver ingots through this process. Eventually one of the Eight Immortals, Lü Dongbin, helped a merchant hit her hair with some silver.

- Guanyin's hair then floated away and became a female white demon snake. The snake would seduce men and kill other women.
- Guanyin then disappeared, but she let some of her blood from her finger flow down the river. A woman named Ge Furen (葛妇人 Lady Ge), whose husband was from the Chen family, then drank some of Guanyin's blood from the water and became pregnant, giving birth to Chen Jinggu. Later Chen Jinggu would fight and kill the white demon snake.
- As for the merchant, he later reincarnated as Liu Qi (劉杞) and would marry Chen Jinggu.

The story continues with how Chen Jinggu grew up, studied at Lüshan, and eventually saved Northern Fujian from drought while defeating the white demon snake, but at the cost of sacrificing her own child. It is said that she died of either miscarriage or hemorrhage from the self-abortion.

Chen's title, Linshui (臨水 near the water's edge), could be related to how Guanyin stood near the water before being hit by silver, ultimately leading to the births of Chen Jinggu and the white snake. It could also symbolize Chen Jinggu's status as a goddess of the sea, with the coastal province of Fujian bordering the ocean. It could also refer to how Chen summoned rainwater to cure a drought in north Fujian.

== Chen Jinggu and three Monkey Saints ==
The inspiration for the Monkey King (Sun Wukong), a main character of the 16th century novel Journey to the West, may have been influenced by the local folk religion of Fuzhou province, where monkey gods were worshipped long before the novel was published. This included the three Monkey Saints of Lin Shui Palace, who were once fiends who were subdued by the goddess Chen Jinggu. The three were Dan Xia Da Sheng (丹霞大聖), the Red Face Monkey Sage, Tong Tian Da Sheng (通天大聖), the Black Face Monkey Sage, and Shuang Shuang San Sheng (爽爽三聖), the White Face Monkey Sage.

== Titles ==
- Chen Jinggu was also given the title of saint (聖誕 for example 正月十四：臨水夫人陳靖姑大奶夫人聖誕).
- Defending Maiden Chen (陈靖姑) where 姑 is as in 姑娘 guniang
- Linshui Nu (臨水嬭)
- Chen Shi Si Nainai (陳十四娘娘) or Fourteenth Damsel Chen
- Shunyi furen (順懿夫人), the Lady of Good Virtue, which is said to have been bestowed during the Song dynasty
- She was also given the title "Just Lady" around 1250 during the Song
- She is also sometimes called the "Goddess of pregnancy"
- The name Linshui Furen (臨水夫人) has been translated as "Lady at the Water's Edge" or sometimes "Water-margin Lady" as Linshui means "near the water".

== Cultural influence ==
- In Taiwan, there is a children's festival involving Ox horns (牛角做出幼) which is a coming of age ceremony for young people. It is held in front of Chen Jinggu's shrine, as it is believed in the region that Madame Chen protects children while they are growing up, so the event is in thanksgiving for her protection.
- The people of the Matsu Islands have a tradition of placing gifts in front of Chen Jinggu's shrine in order to pray for the birth of their children (擺嬭).
- After the birth of a child, the fangli nanny (房裡奶) incense table is enshrined in the bedroom for praying to Chen Jinggu.
- Festivals and parades celebrating Chen Jinggu are held in Taiwan.
- In Fujian, the Chen Jinggu festival is held as a 3-day festival. Chen Jinggu is said to have more than 120 million worshippers around the world.
- Chen Jinggu and Mazu are two goddesses that are revered in Southern China. Chen is usually in charge of the domestic or family realm whereas Mazu is in charge of state affairs.
- Chen Jinggu is also worshipped as a goddess in Zhejiang via migration from Fujian.
- Chen is also a goddess of the She people (and the Han people), an ethnic group of China.
- During Chinese New Year, people in Fujian traditionally invite Chen to watch Chinese opera, but Chen also watches movies instead.

== Shrines ==
Chen Jinggu has many shrines located in

- Fujian
- Taiwan
- Macau
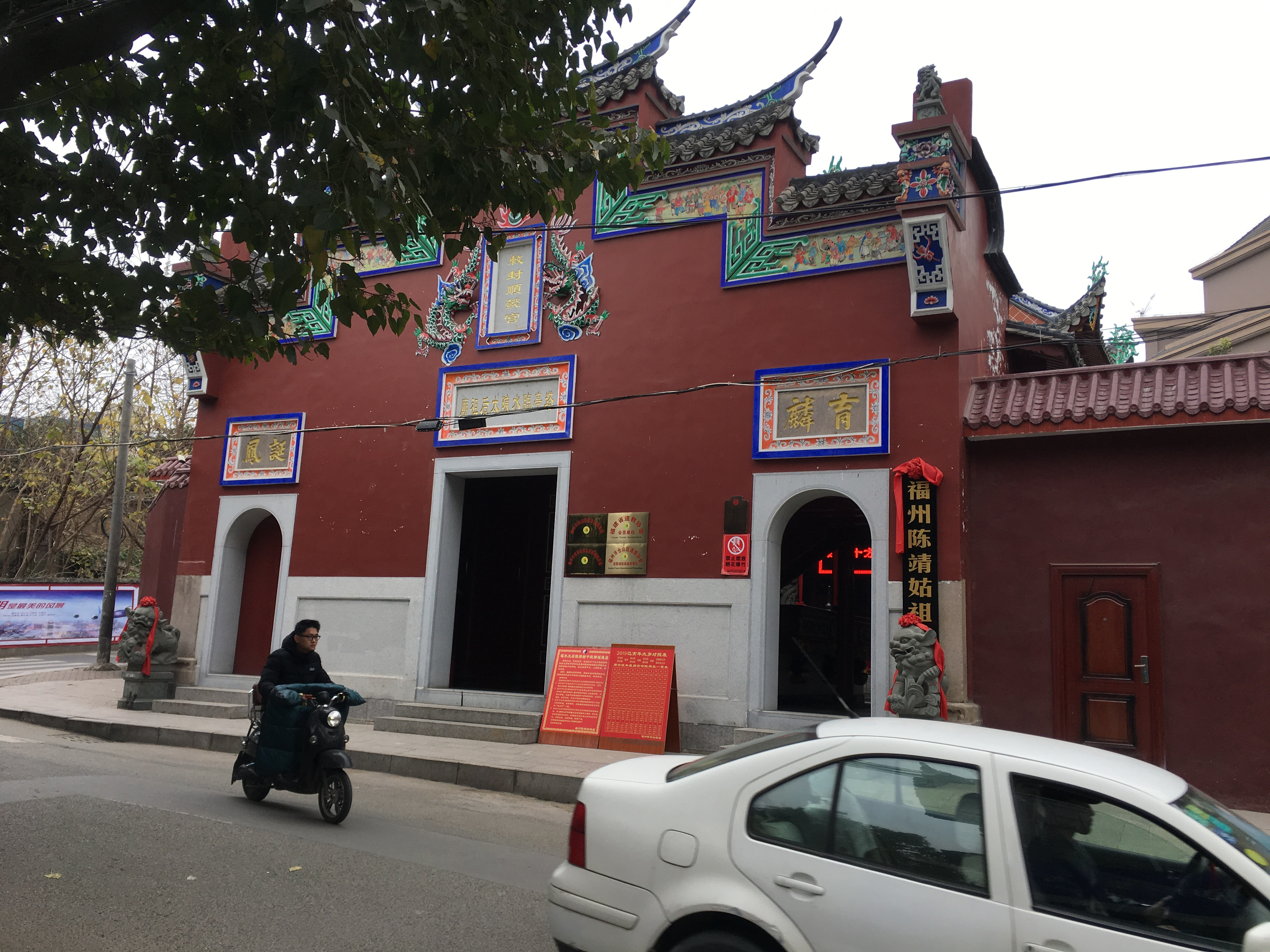
Fuzhou Chen Jinggu temple

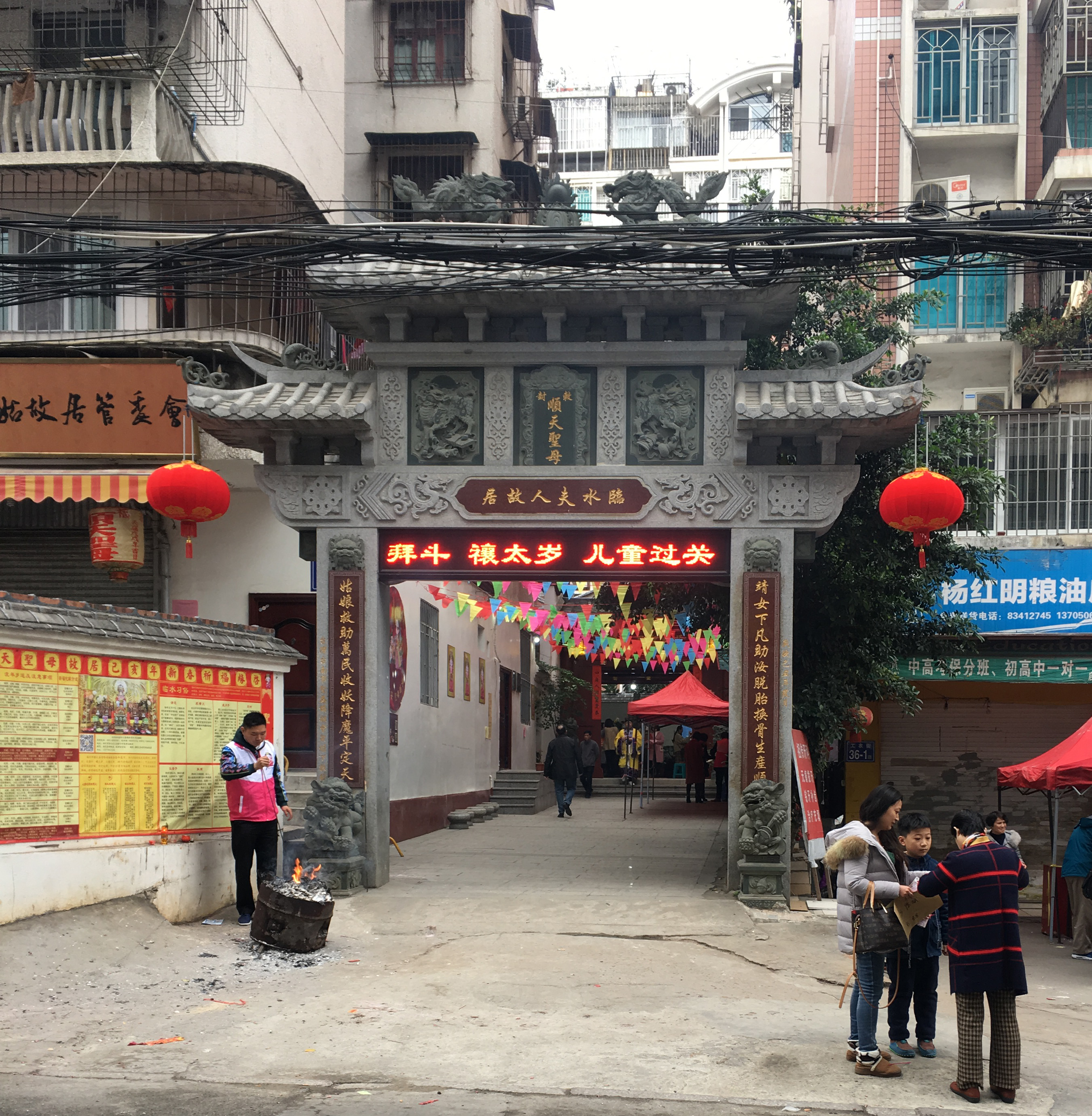
Former residence

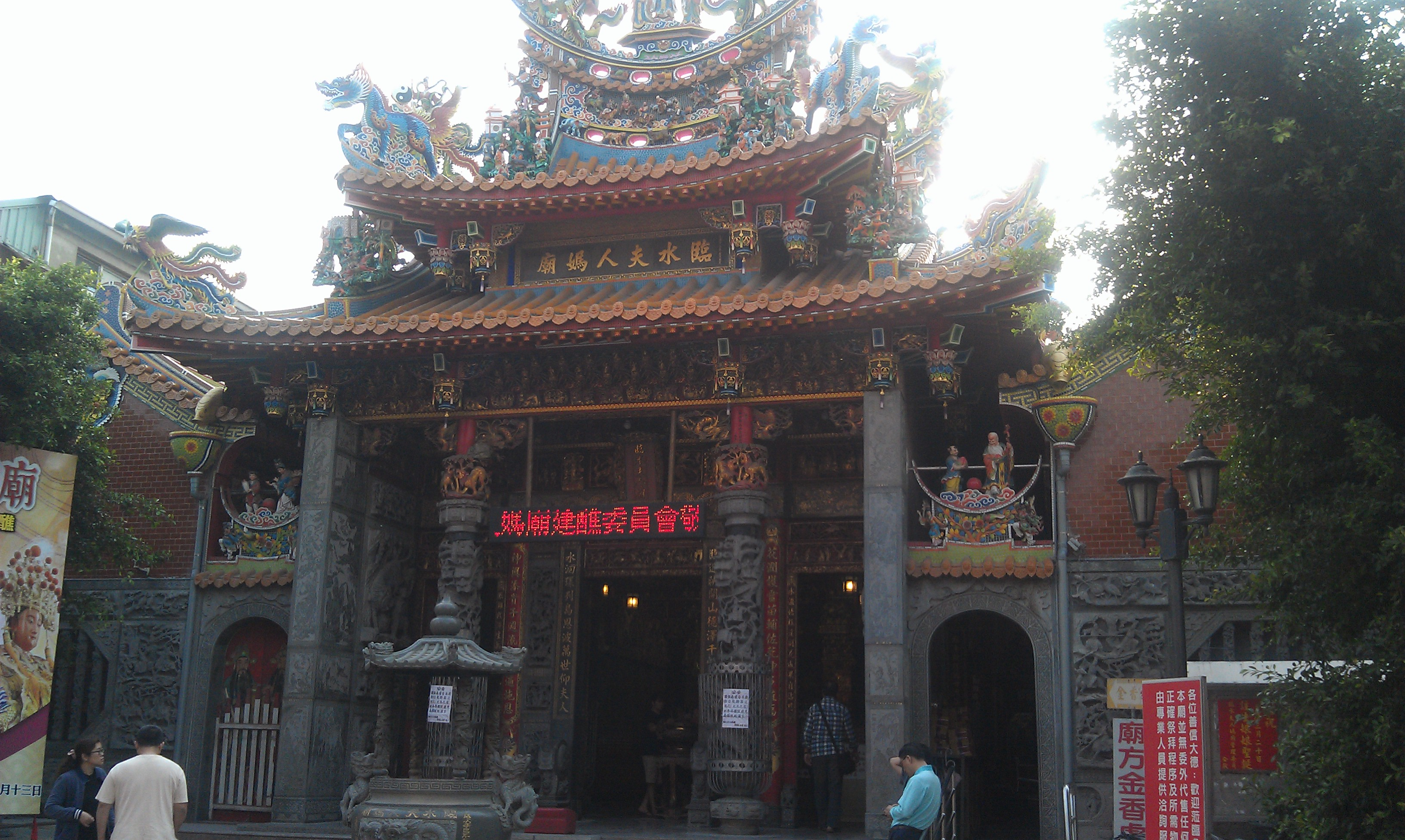
Taiwan temple

== See also ==
- Dragonslayer (heroic archetype in fiction)
- Han E & Hua Mulan, female Chinese warriors
- List of women warriors in folklore
- Susanoo, slayer of eight-headed serpent Yamata no Orochi
- Nezha, opponent of Dragon Prince Ao Bing
- Guanyin, Chen Jinggu is said to be the incarnation of Guanyin from Buddhism
- The Divine Damsel of Devastation, a story from Genshin Impact involving Yun Jin and Shenhe that is partly based on Chen Jinggu's story
- Sitonai, similar Ainu legend
