= List of women warriors in folklore =

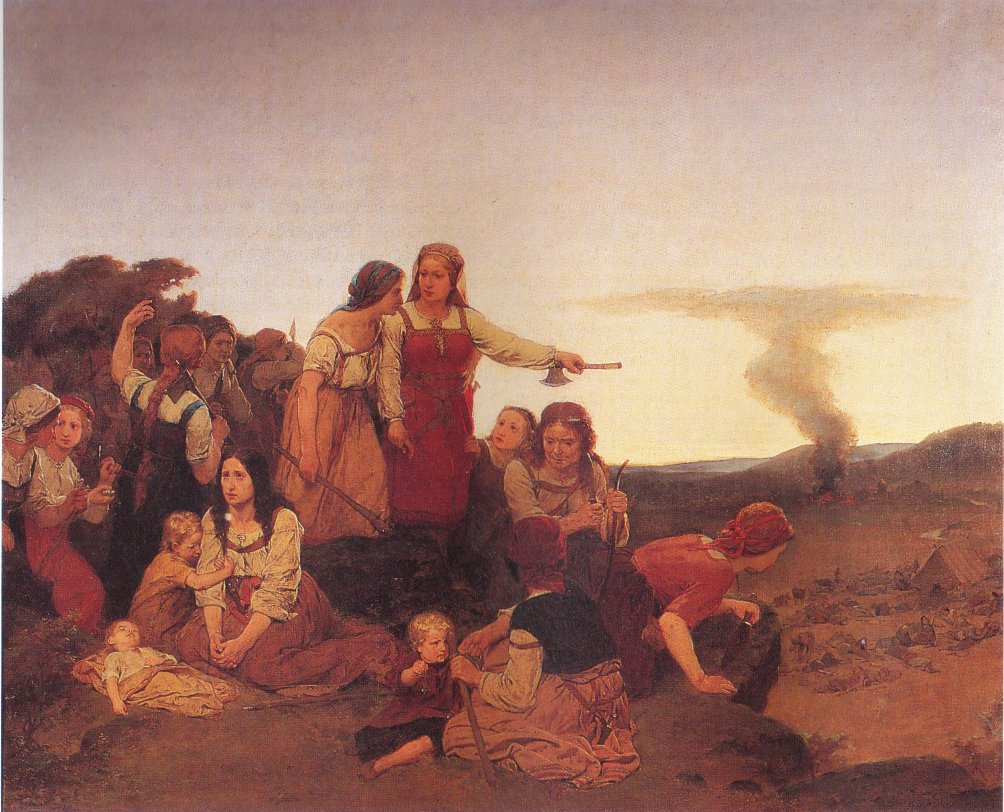
The Swedish heroine Blenda advises the women of Värend to fight off the Danish army in a painting by August Malström (1860).

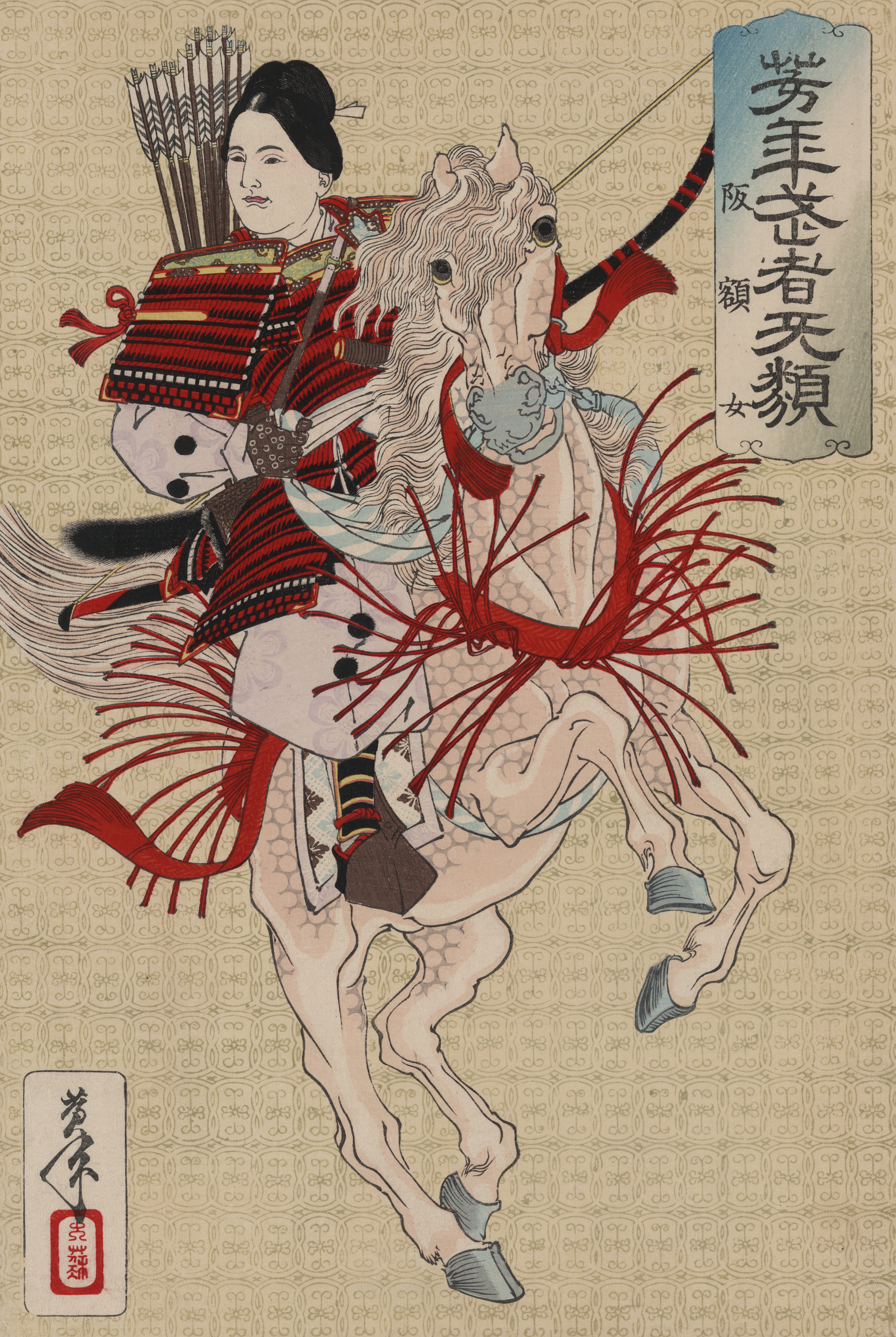
The female warrior samurai Hangaku Gozen in a woodblock print by Yoshitoshi (c. 1885).

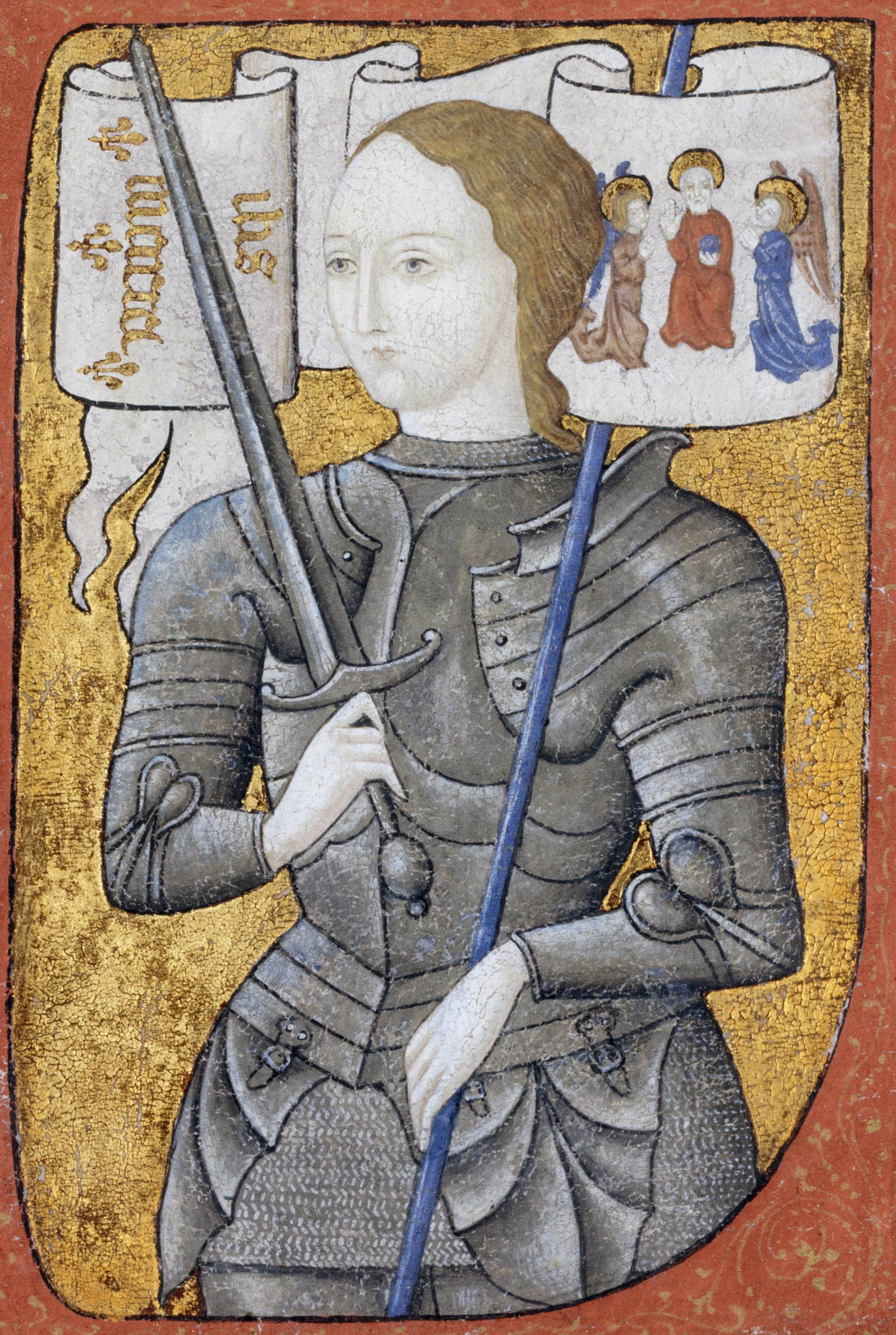
The peasant Joan of Arc (Jeanne d'Arc) led the French army to important victories in the Hundred Years' War. The only direct portrait of Joan of Arc has not survived; this artist's interpretation was painted between AD 1450 and 1500.

This is a list of women who engaged in war, found throughout mythology and folklore, studied in fields such as literature, sociology, psychology, anthropology, film studies, cultural studies, and women's studies. A mythological figure does not always mean a fictional one, but rather, someone of whom stories have been told that have entered the cultural heritage of a people. Some women warriors are documented in the written or scientific record and as such form part of history (e.g. the Ancient Briton queen Boudica, who led the Iceni into battle against the Romans). However, to be considered a warrior, the woman in question must have belonged to some sort of military, be it recognized, like an organized army, or unrecognized, like revolutionaries.

== Pirates and seafarers ==
- Anne Bonny and Mary Read sailed alongside John Rackham. On 22 October 1720, their ship was attacked by former privateer Jonathan Barnet. Bonny and Read alongside the crew are captured after a short battle.
- Ching Shih, legendary "Pirate Queen" of China, famous for commanding over 300 ships and an army of 20,000 to 40,000 pirates. She lived during the 18th and 19th centuries.
- Gráinne O'Malley, legendary "Pirate Queen" of Ireland. She lived during the 16th century.
- Muirisc, daughter of Úgaine Mór (Hugony the Great), the sixty-sixth high king of Ireland, c. 600 BC to AD 500.
- Jeanne de Clisson, French Breton pirate who sided with the English during the Hundred Years war as an act of revenge for the execution of her husband by the French King.
- Rachel Wall, an American pirate with her husband George Wall she and her crew had captured 12 boats killed 23 sailors between 1781 and 1782 before retiring but was caught trying to steal and was executed on 8 October 1789 by hanging

== Africa ==
=== Angola ===
- Nzinga of Ndongo and Matamba fought and held off Portuguese control of present-day Angola for over thirty years during the early 17th century.

=== Benin history ===
- The Dahomey Amazons (or N'Nonmiton, meaning our mothers in the Fon language), were a Fon all-female military regiment in Dahomey, an African kingdom (c. 1600–1894) located in the area of the present-day Republic of Benin. They were so named by Western observers and historians due to their similarity to the semi-mythical Amazons of ancient Anatolia and the Black Sea.

=== Berber history ===
- Kahina or al-Kāhina (Classical Arabic for "female seer"; modern Maghreb Arabic l-Kahna, commonly romanised as Kah(i)na, also known as Dihya or Kahya) was a 7th-century female Berber religious and military leader, who led indigenous resistance to Arab expansion in Northwest Africa, the region then known as Numidia, known as the Maghreb today. She was born in the early 7th century and died around the end of the 7th century probably in modern-day Algeria.

=== Burkina Faso ===
- Yennenga was a legendary warrior woman skilled in spear and bow, considered by the Mossi people as the mother of their empire.

=== Egypt ===
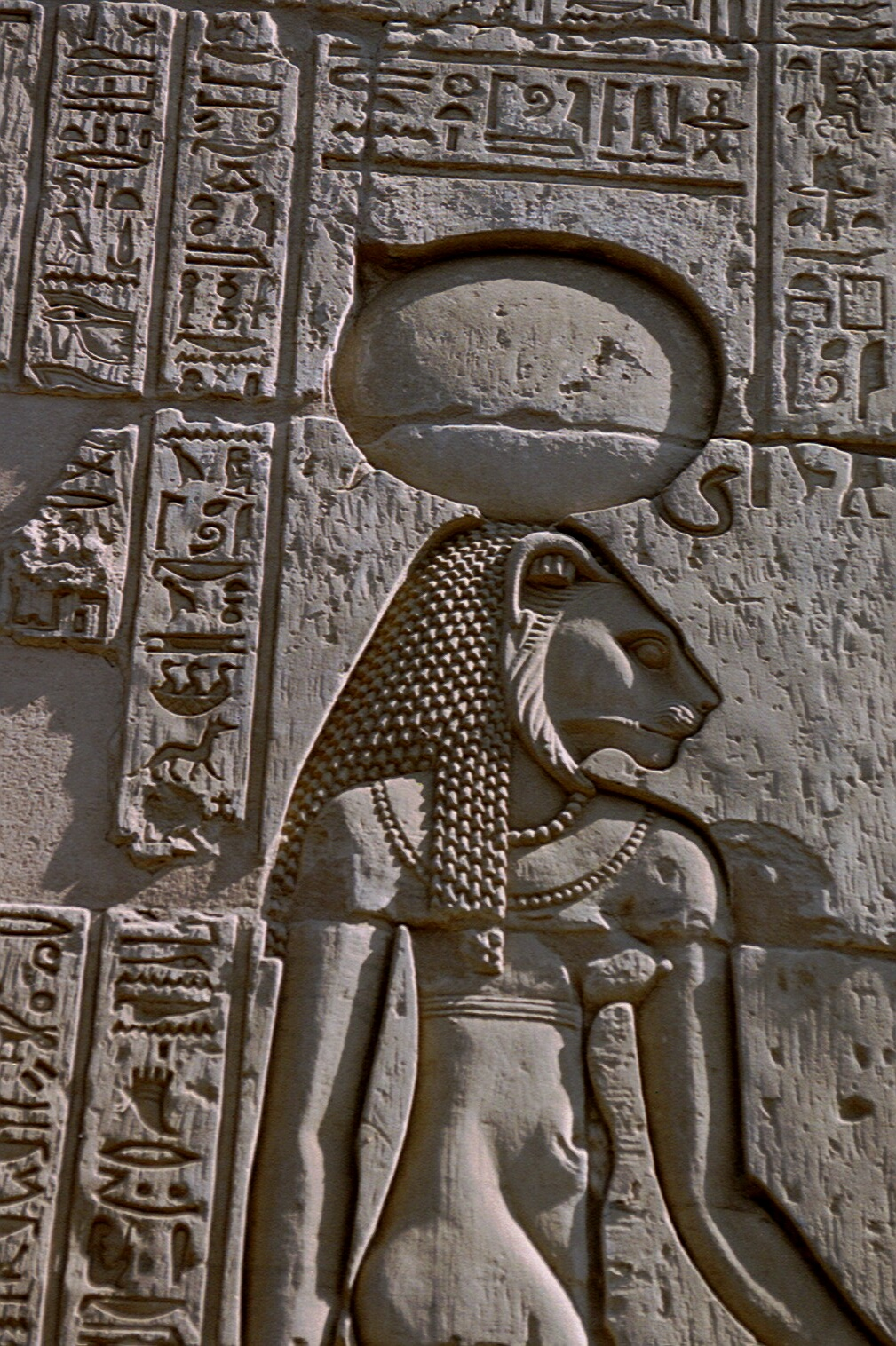
The warrior goddess Sekhmet, shown with her sun disk and cobra crown

- Ankt may have originated in Asia Minor. Within Egypt she was later syncretized as Neith (who by that time had developed aspects of a war goddess).
- Cleopatra VII was a Hellenistic co-ruler of Egypt with her father (Ptolemy XII Auletes) and later with her brothers/husbands Ptolemy XIII and Ptolemy XIV. Her patron goddess was Isis, and thus during her reign, it was believed that she was the re-incarnation and embodiment of the goddess of wisdom.
- Sekhmet is a warrior goddess depicted as a lioness, the fiercest hunter known to the Egyptians.
- Though her reign was primarily peaceful, the pharaoh Hatshepsut fought in several battles during her younger years.
- Nefertiti, wife of the pharaoh Akhenaten, has been at times depicted as smiting enemies in a manner similar to how a male ruler typically would.
- Ahhotep, wife of Seqenenre Tao II, was believed to have been in command of the army while her son Ahmose I was still young.
- Armenousa was said to have used her marriage entourage to defend Egypt during the Arab conquest. She is probably legendary.

=== Kongo ===
- Aqualtune was a princess of Kongo who led an army of ten thousand in the Battle of Mbwila, where she was captured. She was enslaved and carried to Brazil, where according to legend she escaped and founded the runaway slave settlement of Quilombo dos Palmares, or Angola Janga.

=== Somalia ===
- Arawelo was a legendary ancient Somali queen. The queen defied gender roles of the time. During her reign, Arawelo's husband objected to her self-ascribed role as the breadwinner to all of society, as he thought women should restrict themselves to merely domestic duties about the house and leave everything else to men. In response, Arawelo demanded that all women across the land abandon their womanly role in society, and started hanging men by their testicles.

=== Ethiopia ===
- Gudit (Ge'ez: Yodit, Judith) is a semi-legendary, non-Christian, Beta Israel, queen (flourished c.960) who laid waste to Aksum and its countryside, destroyed churches and monuments, and attempted to exterminate the members of the ruling Axumite dynasty. Her deeds are recorded in the oral tradition and mentioned incidentally in various historical accounts.

=== Ghana (then Gold Coast) ===
- Yaa Asantewaa was the Queen Mother of Ejisu (Asante Confederacy)—now part of modern-day Ghana. In 1900 she led the Ashanti rebellion known as the War of the Golden Stool against British colonialism.

=== Hausa history ===
- Amina Sukhera (also called Aminatu) was a Muslim princess of the royal family of the Kingdom of Zazzau, in what is now northeast Nigeria, who lived c. 1533 – 1610. Her military achievements brought her great wealth and power; she was responsible for conquering many of the cities in the area surrounding her seat.
- Sarraounia Mangou, chief/priestess of the animist Azna subgroup of the Hausa, who fought French colonial troops of the Voulet–Chanoine Mission at the Battle of Lougou (in present-day Niger) in 1899. She is the subject of the 1986 film Sarraounia based on the novel of the same name by Nigerien writer Abdoulaye Mamani.

=== Yoruba mythology and history ===
- Oya is the Orisha of the Niger River. She is the warrior-spirit of the wind, lightning, fertility, fire, and magic. It is believed that she creates hurricanes and tornadoes, and serves as guardian of the underworld. Prior to her post-mortem deification, the historical Oya was a queen of the Oyo clan as the consort of Shango, its reigning king. She is often depicted with leopard-like spots, these being either war paint or ritual scarification. This is done for propaganda purposes, as the Leopard is famous in Yoruba folklore for its cunning.
- Efunroye Tinubu was a powerful titled aristocrat in Colonial Nigeria. As the first Iyalode of Egbaland, she and her private battalion fought against the Dahomeyans when they invaded Abeokuta in the 1850s and the 1860s.

=== Nubia/Kush (Sudanese) history ===
- The legendary Candace of Meroe (a title, her real name never given) was a warrior queen in the Alexander Romance who caused Alexander the Great himself to retreat upon witnessing the army she'd gathered. This however may be classified a non-historical account because Alexander never reached Sudan.
- Amanirenas, however, was a historical holder of the title of Candace who fought against the Romans after their conquest of Egypt.

== Americas ==
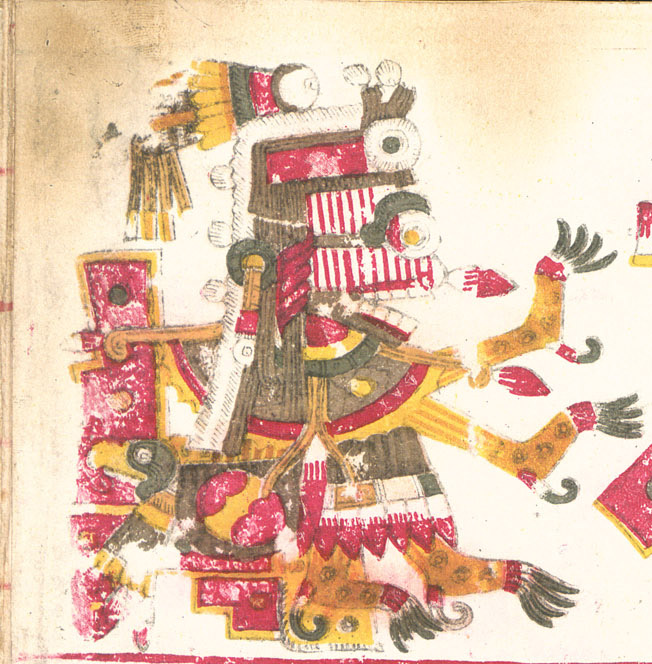
Depiction of the Aztec goddess Itzpapalotl from the Codex Borgia.

=== Native Americans ===
- Nonhelema was a Shawnee chieftess and sister of Cornstalk. She was known by white settlers as the Grenadier or Grenadier Squaw because of her height. She promoted an alliance with the Americans on the frontier in Ohio.
- Woman Chief (c. 1806 – 1858) was a Crow chief and war leader in the mid-19th century. Born to the Gros Ventre people, she was adopted into the Crow. She gained renown in battles and raids, and assumed leadership of her lodge when her father died, becoming a leading chief. She married four wives and later participated in peace negotiations after the 1851 Treaty of Fort Laramie.
- Running Eagle: she became a Blackfoot (Piegan) warrior after her husband was killed by the Crow.
- Colestah: In the 1858 battle of Spokane Plains in Washington, Yakama leader Kamiakin's wife Colestah was known as a medicine woman, psychic, and warrior. Armed with a stone war club, Colestah fought at her husband's side. When Kamiakin was wounded, she rescued him, and then used her healing skills to cure him.
- Buffalo Calf Road Woman: In the 1876 battle of the Rosebud in Montana, Buffalo Calf Road (aka Calf Trail Woman), the sister of Comes in Sight, rode into the middle of the warriors and saved the life of her brother. Buffalo Calf Road had ridden into battle that day next to her husband Black Coyote. This was considered to be one of the greatest acts of valor in the battle.
- Moving Robe Woman: One of the best-known battles in the annals of Indian-American warfare is the 1876 Battle of the Greasy Grass in Montana where Lt. Col. George Armstrong Custer was defeated. One of those who led the counterattack against the cavalry was the woman Tashenamani (Moving Robe).
- Lozen (c. 1840 – 17 June 1889) was a female warrior and prophet of the Chihenne Chiricahua Apache. She spent most of her adult life fighting the Apache Wars alongside her brother Victorio and the legendary Geronimo.

==== Aztec mythology ====
- Itzpapalotl is a fearsome skeletal warrior goddess who ruled over the paradise world of Tamoanchan.

==== Tupi mythology ====
- Iara was a very skilled warrior who aroused the envy of her brothers. She accidentally kills them when they decide to attack her, so she is punished by her father by being drowned, but she is saved by the moon goddess, Jaci, and is transformed into a mermaid.

=== American Civil War ===
- Frances Clayton disguised herself as a man to serve in the Union Army in the American Civil War.
- Sarah Pritchard, who fought with the 26th Infantry of the Confederate Army alongside her husband, until wounded. She was sent home, whereupon she switched sides and fought guerrilla style for the Union.
- Harriet Tubman escaped slavery and then led other escaped slaves into the northern union states and Canada. Tubman became the first woman to lead an armed assault during the American Civil War.

=== American Old West ===
- Calamity Jane was a frontierswoman and professional scout best known for her claim of being a close friend of Wild Bill Hickok. She gained fame fighting Native Americans.

=== American Revolution ===
- Deborah Sampson, first known female to fight in the American military (after disguising herself as a man)
- Molly Pitcher, nickname of an American woman or women who fired artillery during the American Revolutionary War.
- Sally St. Clair, Creole woman killed during the Siege of Savannah
- Tyonajanegen, recognized by the United States military as the first Native American woman to serve American Colonial forces during the Battle of Oriskany 6 August 1777

=== Mexican Revolution ===
- La Adelita is a folk song about a female soldier in the revolution who fell in love with Francisco I. Madero. Today, Adelita has become an archetype of women warriors in Mexico, and a symbol of action and inspiration.

=== Argentina – Bolivia ===
- Juana Azurduy de Padilla was a military leader during the Argentine War of Independence and Bolivian War of Independence. She was appointed commander of the patriotic Northern Army of the Revolutionary Government of the United Provinces of the Rio de la Plata after the death of her husband.
- María Remedios del Valle also known as the "Madre de la Patria" (Mother of the Homeland) was an Afro-Argentine soldier who participated in the Argentine War of Independence and eventually got recognized with the rank of captain in the army.

=== Brazil ===
- Maria Quitéria, dressed as a man, enlisted in the forces fighting for Brazilian Independence. Once discovered, she was promoted to cadet and afterwards alferez. Her courage was recognized by the Emperor Pedro I.
- Anita Garibaldi, fought on the Ragamuffin War
- Maria Bonita, a member of a Cangaço band, marauders and outlaws who terrorized the Brazilian Northeast in the 1920s and 1930s. Maria Bonita means "Beautiful Maria". She has the status of a 'folk heroine' in Brazil.

== East Asia ==
=== Historical Mongolia ===
- Khutulun was a 13th-century Mongol princess, the daughter of the Mongol leader Qaidu Khan and a great-great-granddaughter of Genghis Khan. According to legend she was a skilled warrior and wrestler who vowed that she would only marry a man who could defeat her in wrestling. Although no man was ever able to out-wrestle her, Khutuln ended up marrying a warrior named Abtakul (possibly to squelch rumors about an incestuous relationship between her and her father). Her story was made famous by foreign chroniclers Marco Polo, and Ibn Battuta, both of whom had heard of Khutuln's legend on their travels through Asia.

=== Historical China ===
- Hua Mulan was a (possibly legendary) woman who went to war disguised as a man, and was able to return home after years of war without being found out.
- Ng Mui was a Shaolin monastery abbess who created a kung fu system especially suitable for women.
- Yim Wing-chun, often cited in Wing Chun legends as the first Wing Chun master outside the monastic tradition, was a pupil of Ng Mui.
- Fu Hao was one of the many wives of King Wu Ding of the Shang Dynasty and, unusually for that time, also served as a military general and high priestess.
- Mother Lü began a peasant rebellion.
- Li Xiu defeated rebels as a military commander.
- Lady of Yue was a famous swordswoman.
- Qin Liangyu fought battles with her husband.
- Liang Hongyu was a Chinese general of the Song Dynasty.
- Sun Shangxiang, who is often depicted as a tomboy, was the sister of the warlord Sun Quan. She received extensive martial arts training, and her maidservants were armed with weapons, which was odd for her time.
- Lady Zhurong It's unknown whether she existed, but she was the only woman portrayed in the Romance of the Three Kingdoms who took part in fighting in the war during the three kingdoms period alongside her husband.
- Mu Guiying was a woman who commanded the armies against barbarian invaders
- Princess Pingyang formed a rebel army to assist her father in overthrowing the Emperor, and was declared 'no ordinary woman' upon her death.
- Ching Shih (1775–1844) prominent pirate in middle Qing China, early 19th century. A brilliant Cantonese pirate, she commanded over 300 junks crewed by 20,000 to 40,000 pirates – men, women, and even children. She challenged the empires of the time, such as the British, Portuguese, and the Qing dynasty. Undefeated, she would become one of China and Asia's strongest pirates, and one of world history's most powerful pirates. She was also one of the few pirate captains to retire from piracy.
- The Ruler of Women's Country is the ruler of a nation in Western Xiliang with an all-female population.
- Ani Pachen was a Tibetan freedom fighter

=== Historical Japan ===
- Empress Jingū was a Japanese empress who led an army.
- Hangaku Gozen was an onna-bugeisha ("woman warrior").
- Tomoe Gozen (c. 1157 – c. 1247) was an onna-bugeisha.
- Marishi-Ten the goddess of heaven, who was adopted by warriors in the 8th century as a protector and patron goddess. While devotions to Marishi-ten predate Zen, they appear to be geared towards a similar meditative mode to enable the warrior to achieve a more heightened spiritual level. They lost interest in the issues of victory or defeat (or life and death), thus transcending to a level where they became so empowered that they were freed from their own grasp on mortality. The result was that they became better warriors.
- Kaihime (presumably born 1572) was said to have fought during the Siege of Odawara and to have personally crushed a rebellion, earning her father the respect of Hideyoshi Toyotomi. However, historians aren't entirely sure if she truly did accomplish those events.

=== Korea ===
- Wonhwa, women warriors of Silla, most probably only legendary

== Southeast Asia ==
=== Historical Indonesia ===
- Cut Nyak Dhien, (1850–1908), leader of the Acehnese guerrilla forces during the Aceh War. Following the death of her husband Teuku Umar, she led guerrilla actions against the Dutch for 25 years. She was posthumously awarded the title of National Hero of Indonesia on 2 May 1964 by the Indonesian government.
- Cut Nyak Meutia, (1870–1910), commander of the Achenese guerrilla forces during the Aceh War. Together with her husband, Teuku Cik Tunong, they worked hand in hand with the Acehnese to fight against the Dutch invasion.
- Admiral Keumalahayati, (fl. 16th century), an admiral in the navy of the Aceh Sultanate, which ruled the area of modern Aceh Province, Sumatra, Indonesia. She was the first woman admiral in the modern world (if Artemisia I is not included). Her troops were drawn from Aceh's widows and known as the "Inong Balee", after the Inong Balee Fortress near the city of Banda Aceh.
- Martha Christina Tiahahu, (1800–1818), a Moluccan freedom fighter and National Heroine of Indonesia. Born to a military captain, Tiahahu was active in the military from a very young age. She joined the war led by Pattimura against the Dutch colonial government when she was 17, fighting in several battles.
- Nyi Ageng Serang, (1752–1838), born under the name Raden Ajeng Kustiyah Wulaningish Retno Edhi, was a commander during the Diponegoro War. The name Nyi Ageng Serang was given to her after her father died of disease and she took over his position. At the beginning of Diponegoro War in 1825, 73-year-old Nyi Ageng Serang commanded the force on a stretcher to help Pangeran Diponegoro fighting the Dutch. One of her best-known strategies was the use of lumbu (green taro leaves) for disguise.
- Teungku Fakinah (1856-1940), was a leader of Acehnese guerrilla forces during the Aceh War. She began to fight against Dutch after the death of her husband, Tengku Ahmad
- Tribhuwana Wijayatunggadewi, was a Javanese queen regnant and the third Majapahit monarch, reigning from 1328 to 1350. She appointed Gajah Mada as prime minister and pursued massive expansion of the empire. In 1331, she led the empire's army personally to the battlefield with the help of her cousin, Adityawarman, to crush the rebellion in Sadeng and Keta.

=== Historical Malaysia ===
- Walinong Sari, (ca. 4th–5th century AD) was a legendary princess of Inderapura, in the Old Pahang Kingdom. She was known for her beauty and strong character. She was an expert in weaponry like Kris, spears and swords, and was also renowned for her mastery of silat, the Malay martial art.
- Tun Fatimah, (ca. 1488–1500s AD) a well-known queen of Johor-Riau Kingdom and daughter of Tun Mutahir, the Malaccan bendahara (prime minister) who lived in during the 16th century. She was one of Malacca's Sultan Mahmud Shah spouses. She was known to help the army to lead the Malays in their fight against the invading Portuguese forces in the early 16th century.
- Siti Wan Kembang, (17th century) was legendary queen who reigned over a region on the east coast of Peninsular Malaysia. She was a warrior queen and engaged in battle on horseback with a sword accompanied by an army of female horse-riders.

=== Historical Philippines ===
- Queen Sima, (ca. 637 AD) The legendary Queen of lower Cotabato known for her sense of justice and respect for the law.
- Urduja, (ca. 1350–1400 AD) a legendary warrior princess who is recognized as a heroine in Pangasinan, Philippines. The name Urduja appears to be Sanskrit in origin, and a variation of the name "Udaya", meaning "arise" or "rising sun", or the name "Urja", meaning "breath". A historical reference to Urduja can be found in the travel account of Ibn Battuta (1304 – possibly 1368 or 1377 AD), a Muslim traveler from Morocco.
- Gabriela Silang, (1731–1761), led insurgents from Ilocos during the Philippine Revolution against Spain, after the death of her husband, Diego Silang. She was captured by Spanish colonial forces in September 1761 and executed in the town square of Vigan, reportedly after watching the executions of all her men.
- Bulaw is a brave and proficient swordswoman in Subanon indigenous narratives. She is the daughter of the Subanen chief Gomotan Sangira.
- There are various women warrior deities in the indigenous Philippine folk religions. In Sebwano and Hiligaynon religious narratives, Ynaguiguinid is the goddess of war. In Tagalog religious narratives, Mayari is the moon goddess of revolutions. In Bicol religious narratives, Haliya is masked moon warrior goddess.

=== Historical Thailand ===
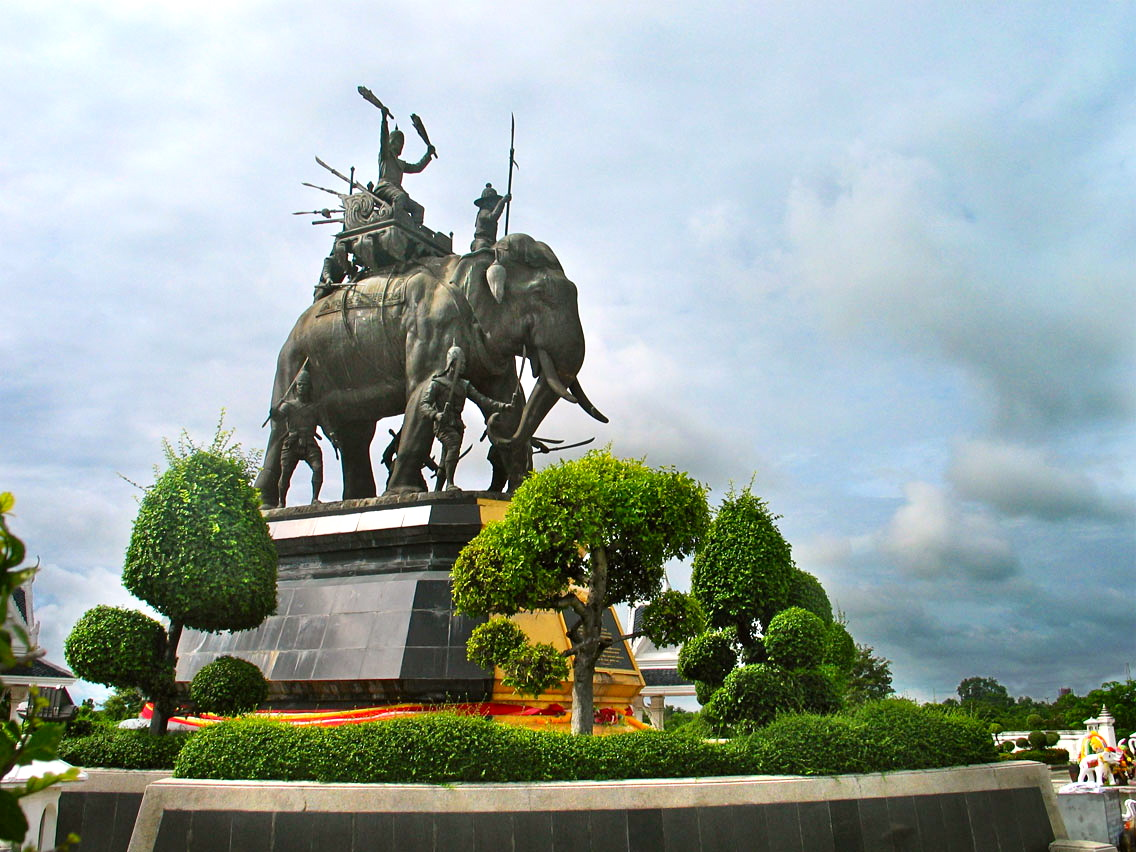
Memorial of Queen Suriyothai in the Ayutthaya Province, Thailand.

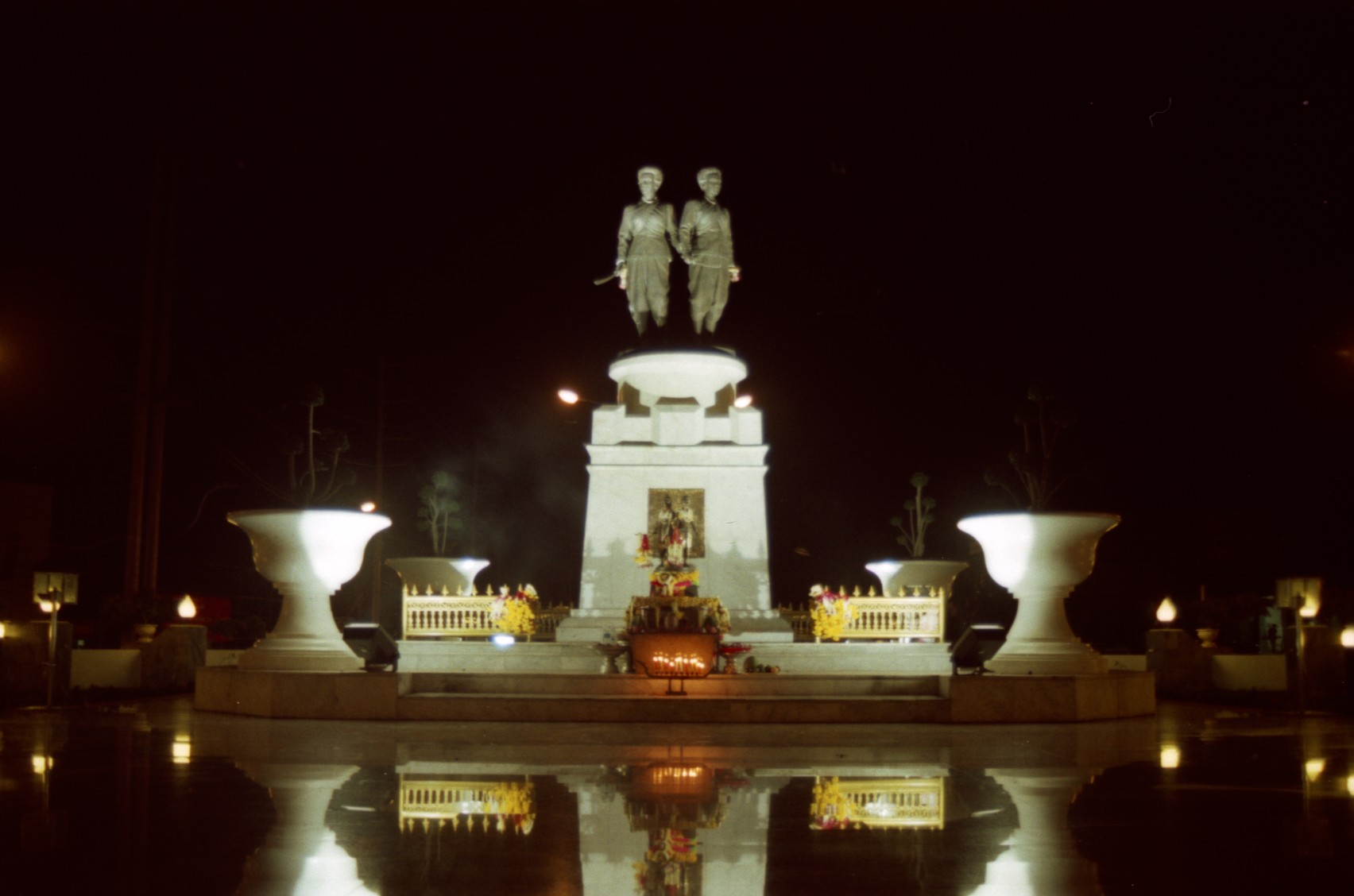
Monument to Thao Thep Kasattri and Thao Sri Sunthon in the Phuket Province, Thailand.

- Somdet Phra Sri Suriyothai (Thai: สมเด็จพระศรีสุริโยทัย) was a royal consort during the 16th century Ayutthaya period of Siam (now Thailand). She is famous for having given up her life in the defense of her husband, King Maha Chakkraphat, in a battle during the Burmese-Siamese War of 1548. For the movie, see The Legend of Suriyothai.
- Thao Thep Kasattri (ท้าวเทพกระษัตรี) and Thao Sri Sunthon (ท้าวศรีสุนทร) were styles awarded to Than Phuying Chan (ท่านผู้หญิงจัน), wife of the then recently deceased governor, and her sister, Khun Muk (คุณมุก), who defended Phuket Province in the late 18th century. According to popular belief, they repelled a five-week invasion by Burmese in 1785, by dressing up as male soldiers and rallying Siamese troops. Chan and Muk were later honored by King Rama I with the Thai honorific Thao, as Thao Thep Kasattri and Thao Sri Sunthon, respectively. The "Heroine's Monument" honouring them is situated on the main highway (402) between the Phuket International Airport and Phuket town.

=== Historical Vietnam ===
- The Trung Sisters, (c. 12 – 43 AD), known in Vietnamese as Hai Bà Trưng ("the two Trưng ladies"'), and individually as Trưng Trắc (Traditional Chinese: 徵側; pinyin: Zhēng Cè) and Trưng Nhị (Traditional Chinese: 徵貳; pinyin: Zhēng Èr), were two first century AD women leaders who repelled Chinese invasions for three years, winning several battles against considerable odds, and are regarded as national heroines of Vietnam.
  - Phùng Thị Chính was a Vietnamese noble woman who fought alongside the Trưng sisters. Legend says she gave birth on the front lines and carried her newborn in one arm and a sword in the other as she fought to open the ranks of the enemy.
  - Lê Chân, general of Trưng Sisters.
- Triệu Thị Trinh once said "I'd like to ride storms, kill sharks in the open sea, drive out the aggressors, reconquer the country, undo the ties of serfdom, and never bend my back to be the concubine of whatever man."
- Tây Sơn Ngũ Phụng Thư (Five Phoenix women generals of Tay Son dynasty):
  - Bùi Thị Xuân, (? – 1802), wife of general Trần Quang Diệu.
  - Bùi Thị Nhạn, (? – 1802), wife of Emperor Quang Trung.
  - Trần Thị Lan, (? – 1802), wife of general Nguyễn Văn Tuyết.
  - Huỳnh Thị Cúc, (? – 1802)
  - Nguyễn Thị Dung, (? – 1802), wife of general Trương Đăng Đồ.

== Europe ==
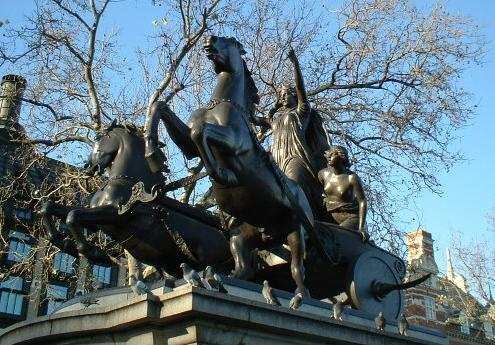
Boudica and Her Daughters near Westminster Pier, London, commissioned by Prince Albert and executed by Thomas Thornycroft

=== Britons, Roman Britain, and history of Anglo-Saxon England ===
Four historical women:

- Boudica was a queen of the Brythonic Celtic Iceni people of Norfolk in Eastern Britain who led a major uprising of the tribes against the occupying forces of the Roman Empire.
- Ethelfleda (alternative spelling Aethelfled, Æthelfleda, Æthelflæd) (872/879 – 918), Queen of Mercia, called "Lady of the Mercians". Daughter of Alfred the Great, she succeeded to Mercian power upon the death of her husband Aethelred, Ealdorman of Mercia (883–911), in 911. She was a skilled military leader and tactician, who defended Mercia against neighboring tribes for eight years.
- Gwenllian ferch Gruffydd was Princess consort of Deheubarth in Wales. Often accompanying her husband on "lightning raids," in 1136 she raised an army herself and led the forces in the battle near Kidwelly Castle. Though defeated, her patriotic revolt inspired others in South Wales to rise. Their battle cry became, "Revenge for Gwenllian!"
- Jane Ingleby of Ripley Castle was an English recusant who fought for the royalists alongside her brother, Sir William Ingleby, 1st Baronet at the Battle of Marston Moor during the English Civil War. Following their loss, she retreated to Ripley Castle, where she held Oliver Cromwell at gunpoint overnight in the library.

Two legendary women:

- Queen Cordelia (on whom the character in Shakespeare's King Lear is based), battled her nephews for control of her kingdom.
- Queen Gwendolen fights her husband Locrinus in battle for the throne of Britain. She defeats him and becomes queen.

=== Celtic mythology and Irish mythology ===
- Andraste is a Celtic war goddess invoked by Boudica while fighting against the Roman occupation of Britain in AD 61.
- Medb (also: Medhbh, Meadhbh, Meab°, Meabh, Maeve, Maev) is queen of Connacht in the Ulster Cycle of Irish mythology. As recounted in The Cattle Raid of Cooley, she started war with Ulster.
- Scathach is a legendary Scottish woman warrior who appears in the Ulster Cycle. She trains Cuchulainn.
- Aife is Scathach's rival in war; she becomes the lover of Cuchulainn and gives birth to his son Connla.
- Liath Luachra, two characters of the same name in the Fenian Cycle.
- Muirisc, legendary warrior princess, daughter of Úgaine Mór (Hugony the Great), the sixty-sixth high king of Ireland.
- Triple warrior goddess: Morrígan, Badb, and Macha (could also include Nemain and Anann)
- On St Kilda, one of the most isolated islands of Scotland, legends exist of a female warrior. A mysterious structure is known as Taigh na Banaghaisgeich, (literally, 'House of the Female-Hero'), the 'Amazon's House'. As Martin Martin, who travelled there in 1697 recorded:

This Amazon is famous in their traditions: her house or dairy of stone is yet extant; some of the inhabitants dwell in it all summer, though it be some hundred years old; the whole is built of stone, without any wood, lime, earth, or mortar to cement it, and is built in form of a circle pyramid-wise towards the top, having a vent in it, the fire being always in the centre of the floor; the stones are long and thin, which supplies the defect of wood; the body of this house contains not above nine persons sitting; there are three beds or low vaults that go off the side of the wall, a pillar betwixt each bed, which contains five men apiece; at the entry to one of these low vaults is a stone standing upon one end fix'd; upon this they say she ordinarily laid her helmet; there are two stones on the other side, upon which she is reported to have laid her sword: she is said to have been much addicted to hunting, and that in her time all the space betwixt this isle and that of Harries, was one continued tract of dry land.

Similar stories of a female warrior who hunted the now submerged land between the Outer Hebrides and St Kilda are reported from Harris.

=== Historical Czech Lands ===
- The story of Šárka and Vlasta is a legend dealing with events in the "Maidens' War" in 7th-century Bohemia.

=== England ===
- Margaret of Anjou, wife of Henry VI, emerged as the de facto leader of the Lancastrians during the Wars of the Roses. She introduced conscription, amassed armies, tortured and burnt to death Yorkist knights and won several battles before ultimately being defeated by the Yorkists.

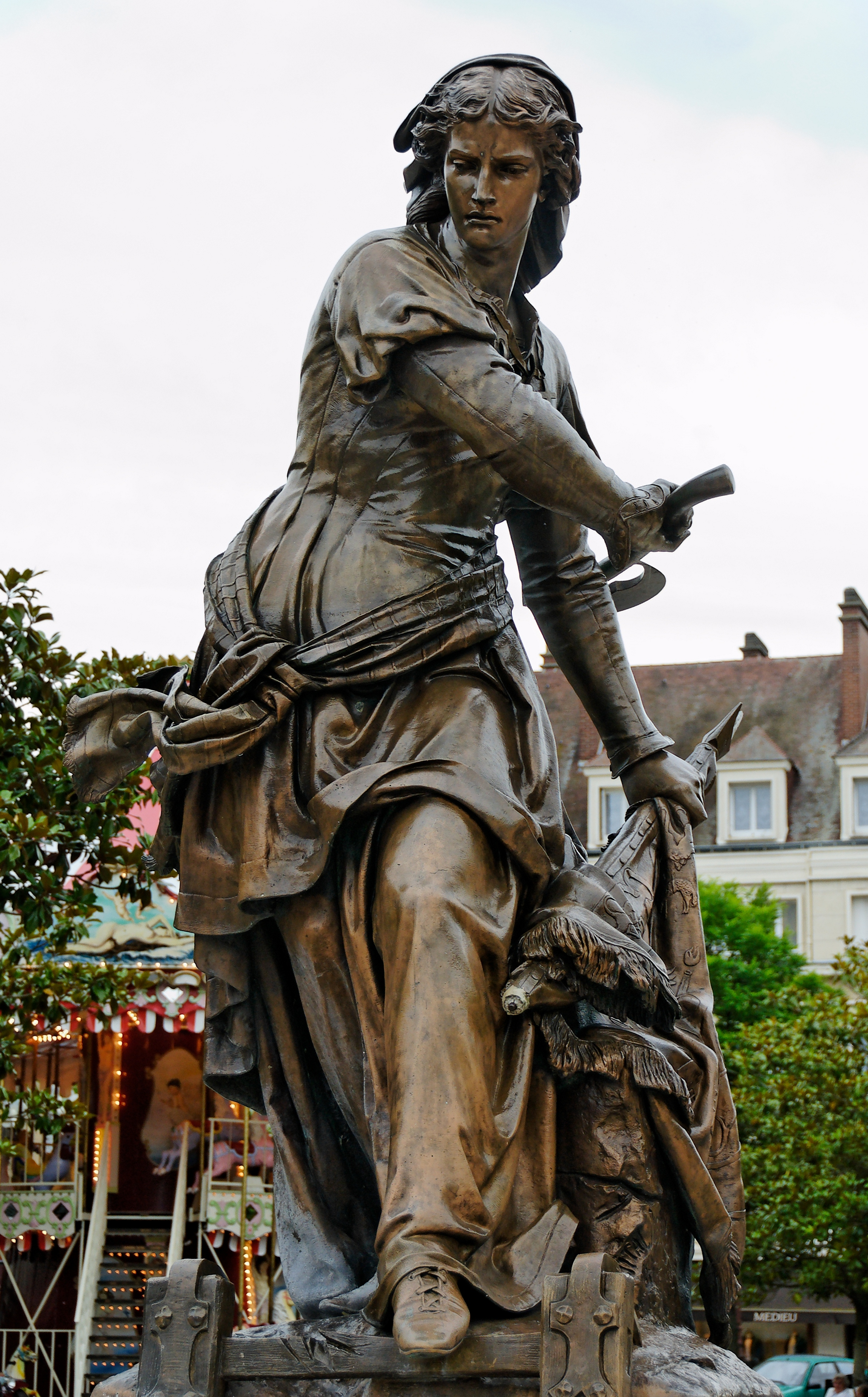
Bronze statue of Jeanne Hachette in Beauvais, by Gabriel-Vital Dubray

- Catherine of Aragon was Queen Regent, Governor of the Realm and Captain General of the King's Forces from 30 June 1513 – 22 October 1513 when Henry VIII was fighting a war in France. When Scotland invaded, they were crushingly defeated at the Battle of Flodden, with Catherine addressing the army, and riding north in full armour with a number of the troops, despite being heavily pregnant at the time. She sent a letter to Henry along with the bloodied coat of the King of Scots, James IV, who was killed in the battle.

=== Duchy of Brittany ===
- Joanna of Flanders (c. 1295 – September 1374), also known as Jehanne de Montfort and Jeanne la Flamme, was consort Duchess of Brittany by her marriage to John IV, Duke of Brittany. She was the daughter of Louis I, Count of Nevers and Joan, Countess of Rethel, and the sister of Louis I, Count of Flanders. Joanna organized resistance and made use of diplomatic means to protect her family and her country. In the siege of Hennebont, she took up arms, dressed in armor, and conducted the defence of the town. She eventually led a raid of soldiers outside the walls of the town and demolished one of the enemy's rear camps. She was an earlier patron for women, and a possible influence to Joan of Arc.

=== Illyria ===
- Teuta was an Illyrian queen and is frequently evoked as a fearsome "pirate queen" in art and stories.

=== The Netherlands ===
- Kenau Simonsdochter Hasselaer (1526–1588) became a legendary folk hero for her fearless defense of the city against the Spanish invaders during the siege of Haarlem in 1573.

=== Albania ===
- Nora of Kelmendi (17th century), is also referred to as the "Helen of Albania" as her beauty also sparked a great war. She is also called the Albanian Brünhilde, for she herself was the greatest woman warrior in the history of Albania.
- Tringe Smajl Martini, young girl in war against the Ottoman Empire army after her father Smajl Martini, the clan leader was kidnapped. She never married, never had children, and did not have any siblings. In 1911, the New York Times described Tringe Smajli as the "Albanian Joan of Arc".
- Shote Galica (1895–1927), remarkable warrior of the Albanian insurgent national liberation with the goal of unification of all Albanian territories.

=== Historical France ===
- Jeanne Hachette (1456 – ?) was a French heroine known as Jeanne Fourquet and nicknamed Jeanne Hachette ('Jean the Hatchet').
- Joan of Arc (Jeanne d'Arc in French) asserted that she had visions from God which told her to recover her homeland from English domination late in the Hundred Years' War. The uncrowned King Charles VII sent her to the siege at Orléans as part of a relief mission. She gained prominence when she overcame the dismissive attitude of veteran commanders and lifted the siege in only nine days. She was tried and executed for heresy when she was only 19 years old. The judgment was rejected by the Pope and she was declared innocent 24 years later (and canonized in 1920).

=== Greek mythology ===
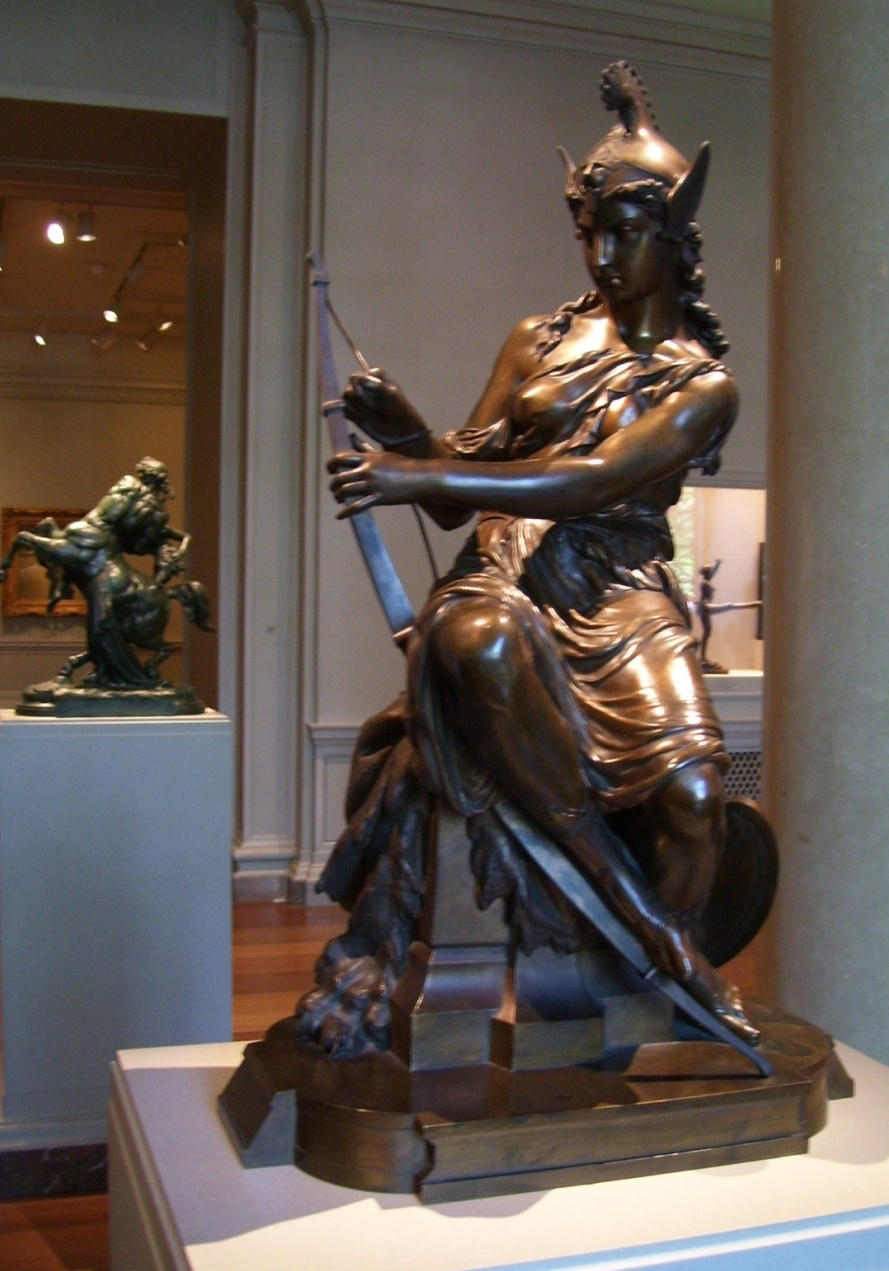
Amazon preparing for the battle (Queen Antiope or Armed Venus) -Pierre-Eugène-Emile Hébert 1860 National Gallery of Art

- The Amazons (in Greek, Ἀμαζόνες) were a mythical and ancient nation of female warriors. Herodotus placed them in a region bordering Scythia in Sarmatia. The histories and legends in Greek mythology may be inspired by warrior women among the Sarmatians.
- Artemis (Latin Diana) is the Greek goddess of the hunt, daughter of Zeus and Leto and twin sister to Apollo. She is usually depicted bearing a bow and arrows.
- Atalanta is one of the few mortal heroines in Greek mythology. She possessed great athletic prowess: she was a skilled huntress, archer, and wrestler, and was capable of running at astounding speeds. She is said to have participated in the Argonaut expedition, and is one of the central figures in the Calydonian Boar hunt. Atalanta was renowned for her beauty and was sought by many suitors, including Melanion or Hippomenes, whom she married after he defeated her in a foot race. According to some stories, the pair were eventually turned into lions, either by Zeus or Aphrodite.
- Athena (Latin: Minerva) is the goddess of wisdom, war strategy, and arts and crafts. Often shown bearing a shield depicting the gorgon Medusa (Aegis) given to her by her father Zeus. Athena is an armed warrior goddess, and appears in Greek mythology as a helper of many heroes, including Heracles, Jason, and Odysseus.
- Enyo, a minor war goddess, delights in bloodshed and the destruction of towns, and accompanies Ares—said to be her father, in other accounts her brother—in battles.
- Hippolyta is a queen of the Amazons, and a daughter of Ares. It was her girdle that Hercules was required by Eurystheus to obtain. He captured her and brought her to Athens, where he gave her to the ruler, Theseus, to become his bride.
- Penthesilea, in a story by the Greek traveller Pausanias, is the Amazonian queen who led the Amazons against the Greeks during the Trojan War. In other stories, she is said to be the younger sister of Hippolyta, Theseus's queen, whom Penthesilea had accidentally slain while on a hunt. It was then that she joined the Trojan War to assuage her guilt. She was killed and mourned by Achilles, who greatly admired her courage, strength, and skill.

=== Historical Republic of Poland and Grand Duchy of Lithuania ===
- Emilia Plater (Emilija Pliaterytė) – Polish-Lithuanian commander in the November uprising against Russia in the 19th century, who became a symbol of resistance and was immortalised in a poem by Adam Mickiewicz. She was a Polish-Lithuanian noble woman and a revolutionary from the lands of the partitioned Polish-Lithuanian Commonwealth. She fought in the November Uprising and is considered a national hero in Poland, Lithuania and Belarus, which were former parts of the Commonwealth. She is often referred to as the Lithuanian Joan of Arc, while actually her most widely known portrait is often mistaken for a picture of Joan of Arc herself in worldwide popular culture (as in the series Charmed), despite the fact that "Joan of Arc" is anachronistically portrayed in Emilia's 19th-century clothing.
- Grażyna (Gražina) – mythical Lithuanian chieftainess Grażyna who fought against the forces of the medieval Order of the Teutonic Knights, described in an 1823 narrative poem, Grażyna, by Adam Mickiewicz. The woman character is believed to have been based on Mickiewicz's own sweetheart from Kaunas, Karolina Kowalska. The name was originally conceived by Mickiewicz himself, having used the root of the Lithuanian adjective gražus, meaning "beautiful".

=== Portuguese legend ===
- Brites de Almeida, aka Padeira de Aljubarrota (Baker Woman of Aljubarrota) was a Portuguese legendary figure associated with Portuguese victory at Aljubarrota Battle over Spanish forces in 1385 near Aljubarrota, Portugal. She supposedly killed seven Spanish invaders by throwing them inside an oven.
- Deu-la-Deu Martins, the heroine of the North. The Castilian had besieged the town of Monção for many weeks and inside the town walls, provisions were almost depleted. Knowing that the invaders also were demoralized that the town resisted for so long and without provisions themselves, Deu-la-deu ("God gave her") made loaves of bread with the little flour that remained in Monção and threw the loaves at the invaders from the walls, shouting at them defiantly "God gave these, God will give more". As a result, the Castilians gave up the siege believing that still there was a lot resistance and infinite provisions within the town walls.

=== Italian history, folklore and Roman mythology ===
- Bellona, is the Roman goddess of war: the Roman counterpart to the Greek war goddess Enyo. She prepared the chariot of her brother Mars when he was going to war, and appeared in battles armed with a whip and holding a torch.
- Bradamante, is the sister of Rinaldo, and one of the heroines in Orlando Innamorato by Matteo Maria Boiardo and Orlando Furioso by Ludovico Ariosto in their handling of the Charlemagne legends. Bradamante and her lover Ruggiero were destined to become the legendary ancestors of the royal House of Este who were the patrons to both Boiardo and Ariosto. Bradamante is depicted as one of the greatest female knights in literature. She is an expert fighter, and wields a magical lance that unhorses anyone it touches. She is also one of the main characters in several novels including Italo Calvino's surrealistic, highly ironic novel Il Cavaliere inesistente (The Nonexistent Knight).
- Marfisa (or Marphisa), is another warrior woman in the Italian epic of Orlando Innamorato and Orlando Furioso.
- Camilla, was the Amazon queen of the Volsci. She was famous for her footspeed; Virgil claims that she could run across water and chase down horses. She was slain by Arruns while fighting Aeneas and the Trojans in Italy.
- Matilda of Tuscany (1046–1115), was a powerful feudal, Margrave of Tuscany, ruler in northern Italy and the chief Italian supporter of Pope Gregory VII during the Investiture controversy; in addition, she was one of the few medieval women to be remembered for her military accomplishments, thanks to which she was able to dominate all the territories north of the Church States.
- Cia Ordelaffi (1351–1357), Marzia degli Ubaldini was an Italian noblewoman from Forlì came in help of Lodovico Ordelaffi during the battle of Dovadola (part of the Guelphs and Ghibellines war). In 1357 she took part in the defense of Cesena during the Forlivesi crusade induced by Pope Innocent VI.
- Caterina Sforza (1463–28 May 1509), was an Italian noble woman and Countess of Forlì and Lady of Imola first with her husband, Girolamo Riario, and, after his death, as a regent of her son, Ottaviano. The descendant of a dynasty of noted condottieri, Caterina, from an early age, distinguished herself by her bold and impetuous actions taken to safeguard her possessions from possible usurpers, and to defend her dominions from attack, when they were involved in political intrigues that were a distinguishing in Italy. When Pope Sixtus IV died, rebellions and disorder immediately spread through Rome, including looting of his supporters' residences. In this time of anarchy, Caterina, who was in her seventh month of pregnancy, crossed the Tiber on horseback to occupy the rocca (fortress) of Castel Sant'Angelo on behalf of her husband. From this position, and with the obedience of the soldiers, Caterina could monitor the Vatican and dictate the conditions for the new conclave. Famous was also her fierce resistance to the Siege of Forlì by Cesare Borgia who finally was able to capture her dressed in armor and a sword in hand. Caterina's resistance was admired throughout all Italy; Niccolò Machiavelli reports that many songs and epigrams were composed in her honour. She had a large number of children, of whom only the youngest, Captain Giovanni dalle Bande Nere, inherited the forceful, militant character of his mother. In the following centuries Caterina was remembered in the folklore as Tigre di Forlivo (The Tiger of Forlì).
- Maroula of Lemnos (fl. 1478), was a Venetian heroine and figure of legend of the Ottoman–Venetian War (1463–1479). She is said to have defended the fortress from invading Ottoman Turks during the 1478 siege of Kotsina Castle, raising the bloody sword of her dying father to lead the garrison into battle.
- Caterina Segurana (1506 – 15 August 1543), was an Italian woman from the County of Nice who distinguished herself during the Siege of Nice of 1543 in which France and the Ottoman Empire invaded the Duchy of Savoy. Caterina Segurana, a common washerwoman, led the townspeople into battle.
- Clorinda, was a valiant Saracen knight and the beloved of Tancred in Torquato Tasso's La Gerusalemme liberata.
- Dina and Clarenza, were two women of Messina who defended their city from an attack by Charles of Anjou during the War of the Sicilian Vespers.
- Fantaghirò, is the main character of an ancient Tuscany fairy tale named Fanta-Ghirò, persona bella, an Italian fable about a rebellious youngest daughter of a warrior king, a warrior princess. Italo Calvino comments on a variant of the tale in his collection of Fiabe italiane.
- Kinzica de' Sismondi, Pisa heroine, probably a legend.

=== Russia ===
- White Tights is an urban legend about Baltic female snipers supposed to have fought against Russian forces in various recent conflicts.
- A polenitsa is an Amazon-like warrior female of the old Russian hero epics (byliny).
- Olga of Kiev the first woman ruler of Kievan Rus' who led a war against the Drevlians.
- Lyudmila Pavlichenko was a sniper in the Red Army during World War II. She was born in Bila Tserkva, Kiev Governorate, in the Russian Empire (now in Kyiv Oblast, Ukraine) on 12 July [O.S. 29 June] 1916. She is the deadliest woman sniper in history.

=== Serbia ===
- Milunka Savić was a Serbian war heroine who fought in the Balkan Wars and in World War I. According to some sources, she is the most-decorated female combatant in the recorded history of warfare.

=== Scandinavian folklore and Germanic paganism ===
- Blenda is the heroine of a legend from Småland, who leads the women of Värend in an attack on a pillaging Danish army and annihilates it.
- Freyja is a fertility goddess, the sister of the fertility god Freyr and daughter of the sea god Njörðr. Freyja is also a goddess of war, battle, death, magic, prophecy, and wealth. Freyja is cited as receiving half of the dead lost in battle in her hall Sessrúmnir, whereas Odin would receive the other half. Some scholars argue that Freyja, Frigg, and Gefion are Avatars of each other. She is also sometimes associated with the Valkyries and disir.
- Shieldmaidens in Scandinavian folklore were women who did not have the responsibility for raising a family and could take up arms to live like warriors. Many of them figure in Norse mythology. One of the most famous shieldmaidens is Hervor and she figures in the cycle of the magic sword Tyrfing.
- The Valkyries in Norse mythology are female divine shieldmaidens, who serve Odin. The name means choosers of the slain.
- Þorgerðr Hölgabrúðr and Irpa are two goddesses, described as sisters, that appear at the Battle of Hjörungavágr to assist the fleet of Haakon Sigurdsson against the Jomvikings. The two goddesses produce harsh thunderstorms, ferocious squalls, and shoot arrows from their fingertips, each arrow described as killing a man, resulting in the defeat of the Jomvikings.
- Brunhild, in the Nibelungen, is "a royal maiden who reigned beyond the sea:

"From sunrise to the sundown no paragon had she.
All boundless as her beauty was her strength was peerless too,
And evil plight hung o'er the knight who dared her love to woo.
For he must try three bouts with her; the whirling spear to fling;
To pitch the massive stone; and then to follow with a spring;
And should he beat in every feat his wooing well has sped,
But he who fails must lose his love, and likewise lose his head."

- In The saga of Hrolf Kraki, Skuld (not to be confused with the Norn of the same name) was a half-elven princess who raised an army of criminals and monsters to take over the throne of her half-brother Hrolfr Kraki, using necromancy to resurrect any fallen soldiers before she personally saw to Kraki's end.
- Lagertha: Lagertha was, according to legend, a Viking shieldmaiden and ruler from what is now Norway, and the onetime wife of the famous Viking Ragnar Lodbrok. Her tale, as recorded by the chronicler Saxo in the 12th century, may be a reflection of tales about Thorgerd (Þorgerðr Hölgabrúðr), a Norse deity.

=== Spain ===
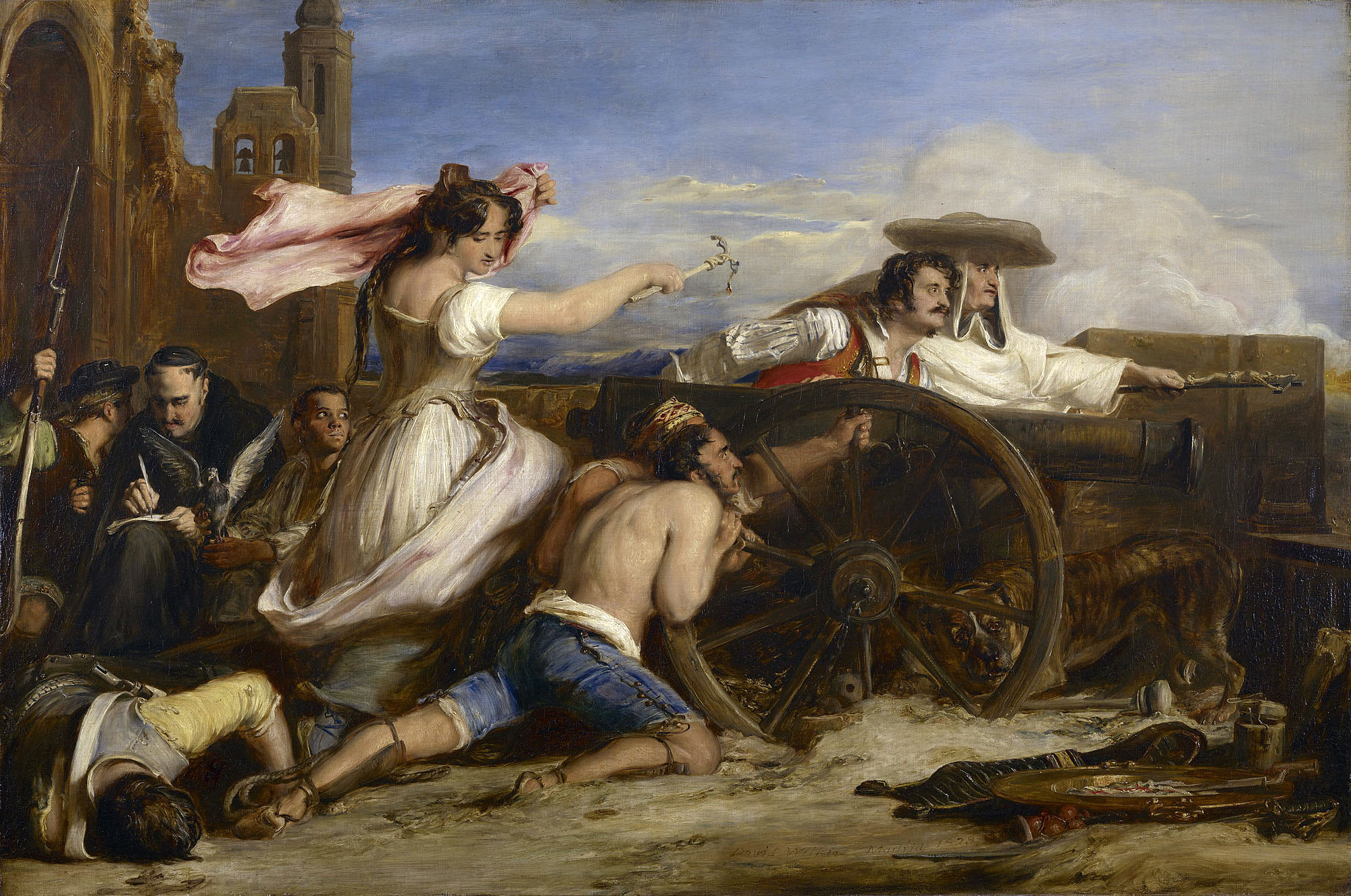
The Defence of Saragossa by David Wilkie, 1828. Agustina, maid of Aragon, fires a gun on the French invaders at Saragossa.

- Agustina de Aragón ('Agustina, maid of Aragon', also known as "the Spanish Joan of Arc") was a famous Spanish heroine who defended Spain during the Spanish War of Independence, first as a civilian and later as a professional officer in the Spanish Army. She has been the subject of much folklore, mythology, and artwork, including sketches by Goya. Her most famous feat was at the bloody sieges of Saragossa where, at the moment the Spanish troops abandoned their posts not to fall to nearby French bayonets, she ran forward, loaded a cannon, and lit the fuse, shredding a wave of attackers at point blank range. The sight of a lone woman bravely manning the cannons inspired the fleeing Spanish troops and other volunteers to return and assist her.
- Ana María de Soto, was the first female marine (infante de Marina) in the world. She joined the Armada at the age of 16, in 1793, posing as a man, with the name of Antonio Maria de Soto, embarking on the frigate Mercedes. She fought in the battles of Banyuls-sur-Mer, Roses, Cape St. Vincent and Cádiz. She was noticed as a woman during a routine medical recognition, and given the rank and salary of sergeant, in 1798. She was authorized to use the marines' colours and sergeant's chevrons in her woman clothes.
- La Galana ('Juana Galán') was another woman who fought in the Spanish War of Independence. She defended Valdepeñas, armed with a baton and aided by the rest of the women in the village because there were not enough men in Valdepeñas due to the war circumstances. They threw boiling water and oil through the windows. French soldiers were delayed in arriving at the Battle of Bailen because of this, so Spanish forces won. Also see Valdepeñas Uprising for more information about this guerrilla action.
- La Fraila lived in Valdepeñas as Juana Galán did. During the Spanish War of Independence offered food and rest in Valdepeñas' hermitage to the French soldiers. When they were sleeping, La Fraila (which is an alias and her actual name is unknown) closed the doors and set the hermitage on fire using gunpowder as vengeance of her son's death by the French army. She died in the fire as well.
- María Pita. She defended A Coruña against Sir Francis Drake's army.

== West Asia ==
=== Antiquity Arabia ===
- Queen Mavia (r 375–425) was an Arab warrior-queen, who ruled over the Tanukhids, a confederation of semi-nomadic Arabs, in southern Syria, in the latter half of the fourth century. She led her troops in a rebellion against late Roman rule, riding at the head of her army into Phoenicia and Palestine. After reaching the frontiers of Egypt and repeatedly defeating the Roman army, the Romans finally made a truce with her on conditions she stipulated.
- Queen Zenobia of Palmyra

=== Islamic Arabia ===
- Khawlah bint al-Azwar was the daughter of one of the chiefs of Bani Assad tribe, and her family embraced Islam in its first days. The recorded history of that era mentions repeatedly the feats of Khawla in battles that took place in Syria, Lebanon, Jordan and Palestine. In one instance, she fought in disguise as a man to rescue her brother Derar after the Romans captured him. The Romans eventually lost the battle and fled. When her identity was discovered, the commander of the Muslim army was very impressed with her courage, and he allowed her to lead the attack against the fleeing Romans; they were defeated and the prisoners were all released. In another battle in Ajnadin, Khawla's spear broke, and her mare was killed, and she found herself a prisoner. But she was astonished to find that the Romans attacked the women camp and captured several of them. Their leader gave the prisoners to his commanders, and ordered Khawla to be moved into his tent. She was furious, and decided that to die is more honorable than living in disgrace. She stood among the other women, and called them to fight for their freedom and honor or die. They took the tents' poles and pegs and attacked the Roman guards, keeping a formation of a tight circle, as she told them. Khawla led the attack, killed the first guard with her pole, with the other women following her. According to Al Wakidi, they managed to kill 30 Roman soldiers, five of whom were killed by Khawla herself, including the soldier who wanted to rape her. She was a brunette, tall, slim and of great beauty, and she was also a distinguished poet.
- Nusaybah bint Ka'ab, also known as Umm Ammarah (Ammarah's mother), a Hebrew woman by origin from the Banu Najjar tribe, was an early convert to Islam. Nusaybah was attending the Battle of Uhud like other women, and her intention was to bring water to the soldiers, and attend the wounded while her husband and son fought on the side of the Muslims. But after the Muslim archers disobeyed their orders and began deserting their high ground believing victory was at hand, the tide of the battle changed, and it appeared that defeat was imminent. When this occurred, Nusaybah entered the battle, carrying a sword and shield. She shielded Muhammad from the arrows of the enemy, and received several wounds while fighting. She was highly praised by Muhammad on her courage and heroism. During the battle her son was wounded and she cut off the leg of the aggressor.
- Hind bint Utbah, was a former opponent of Muhammad in the late 6th and early 7th centuries whom later converted to Islam. She took part in the Battle of Yarmouk in 636, fighting the Byzantine Romans and encouraging the male soldiers to join her, which became one of major key to Muslim victory over Byzantines in the Levant.
- Asmā' bint Abi Bakr, she was one of Abu Bakr As-Siddiq, the first Rashidun Caliph's daughter. She also took part in the Battle of Yarmouk and was one of the key instrumental of Byzantine's army defeat. Al-Waqidi wrote that the Quraysh women fought harder than the men. Every time the men ran away, the women fought, fearing that if they lost, the Romans would enslave them.
- Ghazala, one of Kharijite leaders against Umayyad rule. She made the notorious Umayyad-Iraqi general Hajjāj ibn-Yūsuf flee, and take refuge in his palace in Kufa. Ghazāla also led her male warriors in prayer as well as recited two of the longest chapters from the Quran during the prayer in the Mosque.
- Delhemma was a Muslim commander during the Arab–Byzantine wars. Her real name is Fatima bint Mazlum from Banu Kilab tribe.

=== Mesopotamian mythology ===
- Ishtar is the Assyrian and Babylonian counterpart to the Sumerian Inanna and to the cognate Phoenician goddess Astarte. Anunit, Atarsamain and Esther are alternative names for Ishtar. Ishtar is a goddess of fertility, sexual love, and war. In the Babylonian pantheon, she "was the divine personification of the planet Venus".
- Semiramis was a legendary Assyrian empress-regnant who first came to prominence for her bravery in battle and greatly expanded her empire.

=== Jewish History ===
- Deborah, a prophetess mentioned in the Book of Judges, was a poet who rendered her judgments beneath a palm tree between Ramah and Bethel in the land of Benjamin. After her victory over Sisera, general of King Jabin's Canaanite army, there was peace in the land for forty years.
- Jael – Deborah had prophesied that the honor of defeating Jabin's army would go to a woman. Sisera himself escaped the defeat and fled some distance, seeking concealment in the tent of Jael, who killed him (cf. Judith).
- Hephzibah (warrior) – According to the Apocalypse of Zerubbabel, Hephzibah was a female warrior who slayed two evil kings. Her courageous achievements were part of a Jewish uprising in the pre-Islamic Levant that led to Jews briefly recapturing their holy city of Jerusalem for the first time in almost 500 years (cf. the Bar Kokhba revolt).

=== Persian mythology and history of Iran/historical Persia ===
- Apranik was a Sasanian military commander. She commanded the army of Yazdegerd III against the Arab invasion of 651 AD.
- Artemisia I of Caria was a queen of the ancient Greek city-state of Halicarnassus and of the nearby islands of Kos, Nisyros and Kalymnos, within the Achaemenid satrapy of Caria, in about 480 BC. She was of Carian-Greek ethnicity by her father Lygdamis I, and half-Cretan by her mother. She was the first woman admiral. She fought as an ally of Xerxes I, King of Persia against the independent Greek city states during the second Persian invasion of Greece. She personally commanded her contribution of five ships at the naval battle of Artemisium and in the naval Battle of Salamis in 480 BC. She is mostly known through the writings of Herodotus, himself a native of Halicarnassus, who praises her courage and the respect in which Xerxes held her.
- Gordafarid is one of the heroines in the Shāhnāmeh. She was a champion who fought against Sohrab (another Iranian hero who was the commander of the Turanian army) and delayed the Turanian troops who were marching on Persia.
- Banu Goshasp is an important heroine in Persian mythology. She is the daughter of Rustam and the wife of the hero Giv.
- Banu Khorramdin fought against the occupying Arab forces of the Abbasid Caliphate with her husband, Babak Khorramdin, leader of the Khorram-Dinān.
- Tomyris reigned over the Massagetae, an Iranian people from Scythian pastoral-nomadic confederation of Central Asia. Tomyris led her armies to defend against an attack by Cyrus the Great of the Achaemenid Empire, and, according to Herodotus, defeated and killed him in 530 BC.

=== Phoenician mythology ===
- Ashtart Phoenician "ʻštrt" (ʻAshtart); and Hebrew עשתרת (Ashtoreth, singular, or Ashtarot, plural); Greek (Astarte) is the Phoenician counterpart to the Sumerian Inanna and to the cognate Babylonian goddess Ishtar as well as the Greek Aphrodite. She is a goddess of fertility, sexual love, and war. Ashtoreth is mentioned in the Hebrew Bible as a foreign, non-Judahite goddess, the principal goddess of the homeland of the Phoenicians which is in modern-day Lebanon, representing the productive power of nature. Herodotus wrote that the religious community of Aphrodite originated in Phoenicia (modern day Lebanon) and came to Greeks from there. He also wrote about the world's largest temple of Aphrodite, in one of the Phoenician cities.
- Tanit is a Phoenician lunar goddess, worshiped as the patron goddess at Carthage. Her shrine excavated at Sarepta in southern Phoenicia (Carthage) revealed an inscription that identified her for the first time in her homeland (Phoenicia of the Levant) and related her securely to the Phoenician goddess Astarte/Ashtart. In Egyptian, her name means Land of Neith, Neith being a war goddess. Long after the fall of Carthage, Tanit is still venerated in North Africa under the Latin name of Juno Caelestis, for her identification with the Roman goddess Juno. Hvidberg-Hansen (Danish professor of Semitic philology), notes that Tanit is sometimes depicted with a lion's head, showing her warrior quality. In modern times the name, with the spelling "Tanith", has been used as a female given name, both for real people and, more frequently, in occult fiction. From the 5th century BC onwards, Tanit is associated with that of Ba`al Hammon. She is given the epithet pene baal ("face of Baal") and the title rabat, the female form of rab (chief).

== South Asia ==
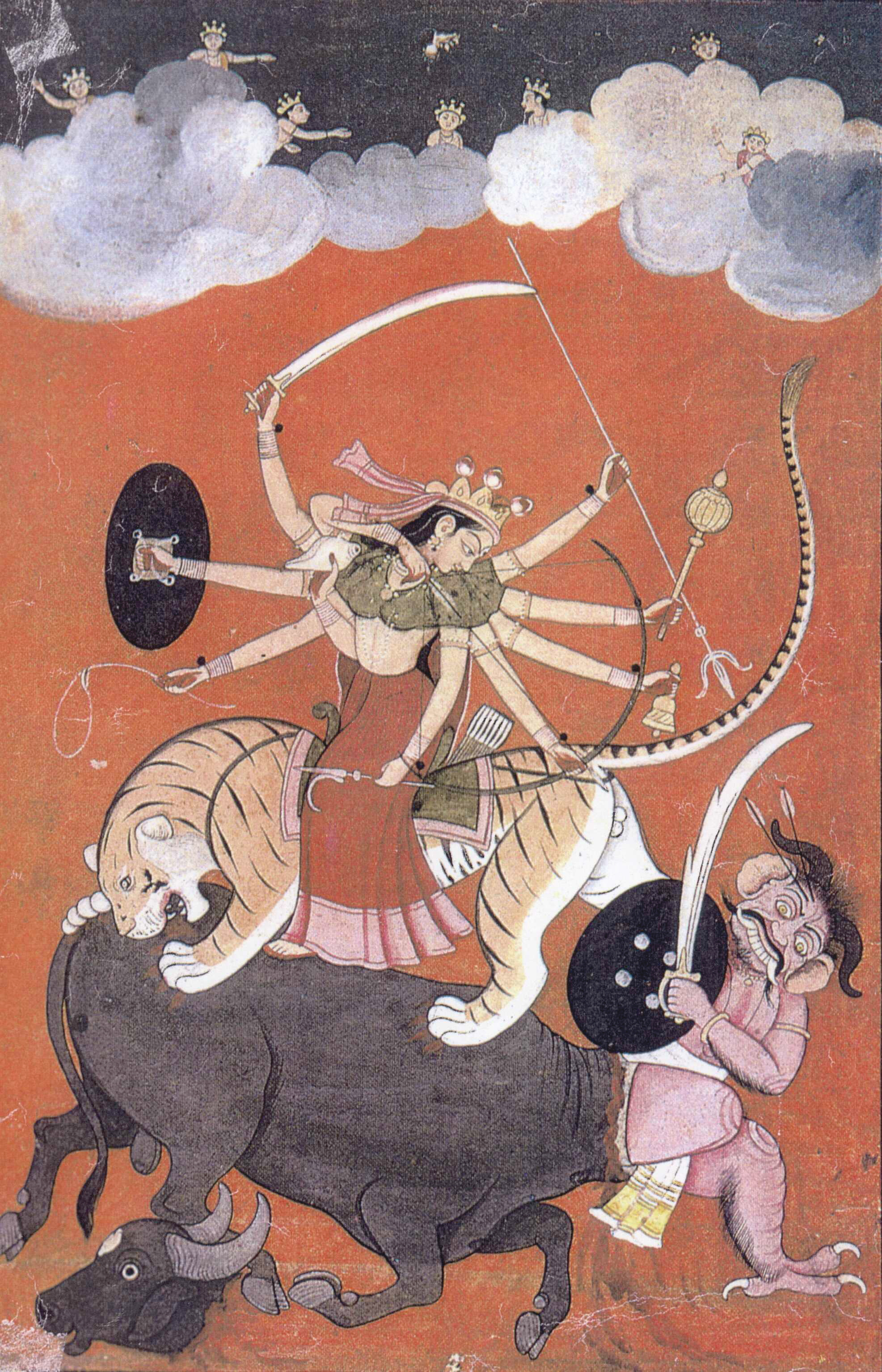
Image of Durga, shown riding her tiger and attacking the demon Mahishasura.

- Akkadevi (11th century) was a princess of the Chalukya dynasty of Karnataka and governor of an area known as Kishukādu. She was known as a capable general who laid siege to the fort of Gōkāge or Gōkāk to quell a rebellion.
- Nayakuralu Nagamma (12th century) was a statesperson to King Nalagama, the ruler of Palnadu in Guntur district, known as a key participant in the Battle of Palnadu.
- Razia Sultana (r 1236–1240), usually referred to in history as Razia Sultan or Razia Sultana, was the Sultana of Delhi in India from 1236 to 1240. She was of Mamluk ancestry and like some other Muslim princesses of the time, she was trained to lead armies and administer kingdoms if necessary. Razia Sultana, the fifth Mamluk Sultan, was the very first woman ruler in Muslim history.
- Rani Rudrama Devi (1259–1289) was one of the most prominent rulers of the Kakatiya dynasty on the Deccan Plateau, is one of the few ruling queens in Indian history. She was born, as Rudrama, to King Ganapathideva (or Ganapatideva, or Ganapathi Devudu). As Ganapathideva had no sons, Rudrama was formally designated as a son through the ancient Putrika ceremony and given the male name of Rudradeva. When she was only fourteen years old, Rani Rudrama Devi succeeded her father. Rudramadevi was married to Veerabhadra, Eastern Chalukyan prince of Nidadavolu.
- Rani Mangammal (1689–1704) was a queen regent on behalf of her grandson, in the Madurai Nayak kingdom in present-day Madurai, India, towards the end of the century. She was a popular administrator and is still widely remembered as a maker of roads and avenues, and a builder of temples, tanks, and choultries with many of her public works still in use. She is also known for her diplomatic and political skills and successful military campaigns. The capital of Madurai Kingdom during her times was Tiruchy.
- Rani Velu Nachiyar (Tamil: இராணி வேலு நாச்சியார்) was an 18th-century Indian Queen from Sivaganga. Rani Velu Nachiyar was the first Queen to fight against the British in India, even preceding the famous Rani Laxmibai of Jhansi. She was the princess of Ramanathapuram and the daughter of Chellamuthu Sethupathy. She married the king of Siva Gangai and they had a daughter – Vellachi Nachiar. When her husband Muthuvaduganathaperiya Udaiyathevar was killed, she was drawn into battle. Her husband and his second wife were killed by a few British soldiers and the son of the Nawab of Arcot. She escaped with her daughter, lived under the protection of Hyder Ali at Virupachi near Dindigul for eight years. During this period, she formed an army and sought an alliance with Gopala Nayaker and Hyder Ali with the aim of attacking the British. In 1780, Rani Velu Nachiyar fought the British with military assistance from Gopala Nayaker and Hyder Ali and won the battle. When Velu Nachiyar finds the place where the British stock their ammunition, she builds the first human bomb. A faithful follower, Kuyili douses herself in oil, lights herself and walks into the storehouse. Rani Velu Nachiyar formed a woman's army named "udaiyaal" in honour of her adopted daughter – Udaiyaal, who died detonating a British arsenal. Nachiar was one of the few rulers who regained her kingdom and ruled it for 10 more years.
- Chand Bibi (1550–1599), also known as Chand Khatun or Chand Sultana, was an Indian Muslim woman warrior. She acted as the Regent of Bijapur (1580–90) and Regent of Ahmednagar (1596–99). Chand Bibi is best known for defending Ahmednagar against the Mughal forces of Emperor Akbar.
- Abbakka Rani or Abbakka Mahadevi was the queen of Tulu Nadu who fought the Portuguese in the latter half of the 16th century. She belonged to the Chowta dynasty who ruled over the area from the temple town of Moodabidri. In Dakshina Kannada's Bantwal taluk, a historian has erected a museum in the memory of a 16th-century warrior queen. The man behind the museum, called Tulu Baduku Museum, is Prof. Thukaram Poojary and his subject is Rani Abbakka Chowta of Ullal. The only woman in history to confront, fight and repeatedly defeat the Portuguese, Rani Abbakka's unflagging courage and indomitable spirit are at par with the legendary Rani Laxmi Bai of Jhansi, Rani Rudramma Devi of Warangal and Rani Chennamma of Kittur. Yet, little is written about her or her incredible story in the history books.
- Tarabai (1675–1761) was a queen of the Maratha Empire in India. She was the queen regent for Shivaji II. From 1700-1707, Tarabai single-handedly directed the defense of Marathas against Mughal Empire. She also founded the Maratha kingdom of Kolhapur and was active in Maratha politics for a long time.
- Bibi Dalair Kaur was a 17th-century Sikh woman who fought against the Mughal Empire.
- Bibi Sahib Kaur (1771–1801) was a Sikh princess and elder sister of Raja Sahib Singh of Patiala. Her brother recalled her after her marriage and appointed her prime minister in 1793. She led armies into battle against the British and was one of few Punjabi Sikh women to win battles against a British general.
- Mai Bhago was a Sikh woman who led Sikh soldiers against the Mughals in 1704. She is known for leading a small force of 40 Sikh warriors to repulse a much larger Mughal army in the Battle of Muktsar. She is revered as a saint in Sikhism.
- Onake Obavva (18th century) was a woman who fought the forces of Hyder Ali single-handedly with a masse (Onake) in the small kingdom of Chitradurga in the Chitradurga district of Karnataka, India. She is considered to be the epitome of Kannada women pride, with the same standing as Kittur Chennamma and Keladi Chennamma.
- Kittur Chennamma (1778–1829) was the queen of the princely state of Kittur in Karnataka. She is known for having led an armed rebellion against the British East India Company in 1824 in defiance of the doctrine of lapse in an attempt to maintain Indian control over the region. Her legacy and first victory are still commemorated in Kittur, during the Kittur Utsava of every 22–24 October.
- Begum Hazrat Mahal (1820–1879) was a warrior who rebelled against the British East India Company during the Indian Rebellion of 1857 and participated in the attack on Shahjahanpur.
- Rani Lakshmibai (1828–1858) known as Jhansi Ki Rani, was the queen of the Maratha-ruled the princely state of Jhansi, was one of the leading figures of the Indian Rebellion of 1857, and a symbol of resistance to British rule in India.
- Jhalkaribai (1830–1858) was an advisor and soldier in Rani Lakshmibai's army. She is known for having disguised herself as the Queen and fought on her behalf, on the front, allowing the Queen to escape safely out of the fort, at the height of the Siege of Jhansi.
- Avantibai ( –1857) was a warrior who raised an army of 4000 and defeated British forces in a battle in Mandla district, Madhya Pradesh during the India Rebellion of 1857.
- Uda Devi ( –1857) was a warrior who fought in the Battle of Sikandar Bagh in November 1857, part of the India Rebellion of 1857.
- Rani Durgavati (1524–1564) was a Queen of Gondwana known for resisting the invasions of Bayazid Baz Bahadur Khan of the Malwa Sultanate and Mughal emperor Akbar.
- Keladi Chennamma (1677–1696) was the daughter of Siddappa Setty of Kundapur. She became the queen of Keladi Nayaka dynasty who fought the Mughal Army of Aurangzeb from her base in the kingdom of Keladi in the Shimoga district of Karnataka State, India. Her rule lasted for 25 years and Keladi kingdom was probably the last to lose autonomy to Mysore rulers and subsequently to British.
- Belawadi Mallamma, to defend her husband's kingdom, she fought against the Maratha king Shivaji Maharaj.
- Unniyarcha: She was a Chekava/Thiyya woman warrior from Puthooram Veedu of Kadathanad (Vadakara), a region in northern present-day Kerala, famous for her valour and beauty.

=== Hindu mythology ===
- Durga (Sanskrit: "the inaccessible" or "the invincible", Bengali: দুর্গা) is a form of Devi, the supreme goddess of Hinduism. According to the narrative from the Devi Mahatmya of the Markandeya Purana, the form of Durga was created as a warrior goddess to fight a demon. The nine-day holiday dedicated to Durga, The Durga Puja, is the biggest annual festival in Bengal and other parts of Eastern India and is celebrated by Hindus all over the world.
- Kālī (Sanskrit: काली, IPA: [kaːliː]; Bengali: কালী; Punjabi: ਕਾਲੀ; Sinhala: කාලි; Telugu: కాళికాదేవి; Kannada: ಕಾಳಿ ಮಾತಾ; Tamil: காளி), also known as Kālikā (Sanskrit: कालिका, Bengali: কালিকা), is the Hindu goddess associated with empowerment, shakti. The name Kali comes from kāla, which means black, time, death, lord of death, and thus another name for Shiva. Kali means "the black one". Although sometimes presented as dark and violent, her earliest incarnation as a figure of annihilation still has some influence. In Kāli's most famous myth, Durga and her assistants, the Matrikas, wound the demon Raktabija, in various ways and with a variety of weapons in an attempt to destroy him. They soon find that they have worsened the situation, for, with every drop of blood that is spilled from Raktabija, he reproduces a clone of himself. The battlefield becomes increasingly filled with his duplicates. Durga, in need of help, summons Kāli to combat the demons. It is said, in some versions, that the Goddess Durga actually assumes the form of Goddess Kāli at this time. Kali destroys Raktabija by sucking the blood from his body and putting the many Raktabija duplicates in her gaping mouth. Pleased with her victory, Kali then dances on the field of battle, stepping on the corpses of the slain. Her consort Shiva lies among the dead beneath her feet, a representation of Kali commonly seen in her iconography as Daksinakali.
- Other warrior goddesses include Chamunda ("the killer of demon Chanda and Munda") and the goddess group Matrikas ("Mothers").
- Vishpala (in The Rigveda) is a warrior queen who, after having lost a leg in battle had an iron prosthesis made. Afterwards, she returned to fight.

== Central Asia ==
=== Afghanistan ===
==== Malalai of Maiwand ====
- Malalai of Maiwand is a national folk hero of Afghanistan who rallied local Pashtun fighters against the British troops at the 1880 Battle of Maiwand.

== See also ==
- Timeline of women in early modern warfare
- Women warriors in literature and culture
- List of female action heroes and villains
