= Ana María de Soto =

Ana María de Soto (16 August 1775 – 5 December 1833), was a sailor in the Spanish military. She was the first woman to serve in the Marine Battalions.

== Biography ==
Ana María de Soto was born in Aguilar de la Frontera, Córdoba, in 1775. In 1793, at the age of eighteen, she posed as a man, using the name of Antonio María de Soto, and enlisted in the Navy Battalions. On 4 January 1794 she embarked on the frigate Mercedes. During her military life, she served as a soldier in the 6th Company of the 11th Marine Battalion, participating in the attack on Bañuls in Catalonia; in the defense and abandonment of Roses, Girona; in the Battle of Cape St Vincent; and in the fuerzas sutiles during the Cádiz defense.

De Soto was discharged from the frigate Matilde on 7 July 1798, when it was discovered that she was a woman during a routine medical examination. On 24 July 1798, to honor her heroic behavior, the King Charles IV granted De Soto a salary and sergeant's rank, so that she could take care of her family. She was also authorized to use the colors of the naval battalions and sergeant badges on women's clothes. She was granted an absolute license on 1 August 1798.

From her later life it is known that he ran a tobacconist's shop in Montilla, his father's hometown, and that she died on 5 December 1833, at the age of 58.

== Bibliography ==
- Cesareo, Fernández Duro (1972). Armada Española, desde la unión de los reinos de Castilla y Aragón (PDF) (in Spanish). Vol. VIII. Museo Naval de Madrid. pp. 423–24.
- Parente Domínguez, Gonzalo (2010). Ministerio de Defensa (ed.). "Una mujer en la Infantería de marina del XVIII" (PDF). Revista Española de Defensa (in Spanish) (259). Madrid: 56–57. ISSN 1131-5172.
