= Bibi Dalair Kaur =

Bibi Dalair Kaur (fl. early 18th century) was a Sikh woman who fought against the Mughals. She rallied 100 Sikh women against the Mughals at the Battle of Chamkaur, on December 6, 1704. She was killed and is considered to be a martyr among Sikhs.

== Sources ==
- "Bibi Dalair Kaur" from Allaboutsikhs.com, URL accessed 12/01/06
