= Han E (warrior) =

Chinese war heroine

- Traditional Chinese: 韓娥
- Simplified Chinese: 韩娥
Transcriptions
Standard Mandarin
- Hanyu Pinyin: Hán É
- Wade–Giles: Han O

Han E (born 1345) was an ethnic Han female warrior who is considered a war heroine. She served in the anti-Yuan dynasty Red Turbans dressed as a man under the name Han Guanbao. She was promoted to the rank of lieutenant and became famous as the "Hua Mulan of Shu".

== Biography ==
Han E was the daughter of the academic Han Cheng in Sichuan. When the uprising against the Mongols broke out in 1361, she was dressed as a man by her family as a protective measure. The disguise led to her enlistment in the army. She fought there for twelve years dressed as a man under the name Han Guanbao under the command of Wang Quyan and Luo Jia. The revelation of the disguise is said to have come when her general gained so much confidence in her that he wanted to make her his son-in-law and married her daughter, which led to a conflict when she refused to consummate the marriage, and finally to the disclosure, which allowed her to return to her family and be married. In some versions of the story, she married a soldier named Ma Fuzong.

Her deeds were perceived by her contemporaries as something admirable, especially as on her wedding night it turned out that she was still a virgin, and she was already celebrated during her time as a chaste war heroine. Her biography was first written in 1409.
