= Knockmore (disambiguation) =

Knockmore is an upland region in County Fermanagh, Northern Ireland.

Knockmore may also refer to:

- Knockmore, County Cork, Ireland
- Knockmore, County Cavan, Ireland
- Knockmore, County Kerry, a 565 m peak in the Slieve Mish Mountains
- Knockmore, County Mayo, Ireland
- Knockmore, County Mayo, part of the Parish of Backs in the Roman Catholic Diocese of Killala
- Knockmore, County Westmeath, a townland in the civil parish of Newtown, barony of Moycashel, Ireland
- Knockmore, Mayo, a mountain on Clare Island, County Mayo, Ireland
- Knockmore GAA, a Gaelic football club based in County Mayo, Ireland
- Knockmore railway station, a former railway station in County Antrim, Northern Ireland
