= Clare Island =

Island in County Mayo, Ireland

Native name: Cliara
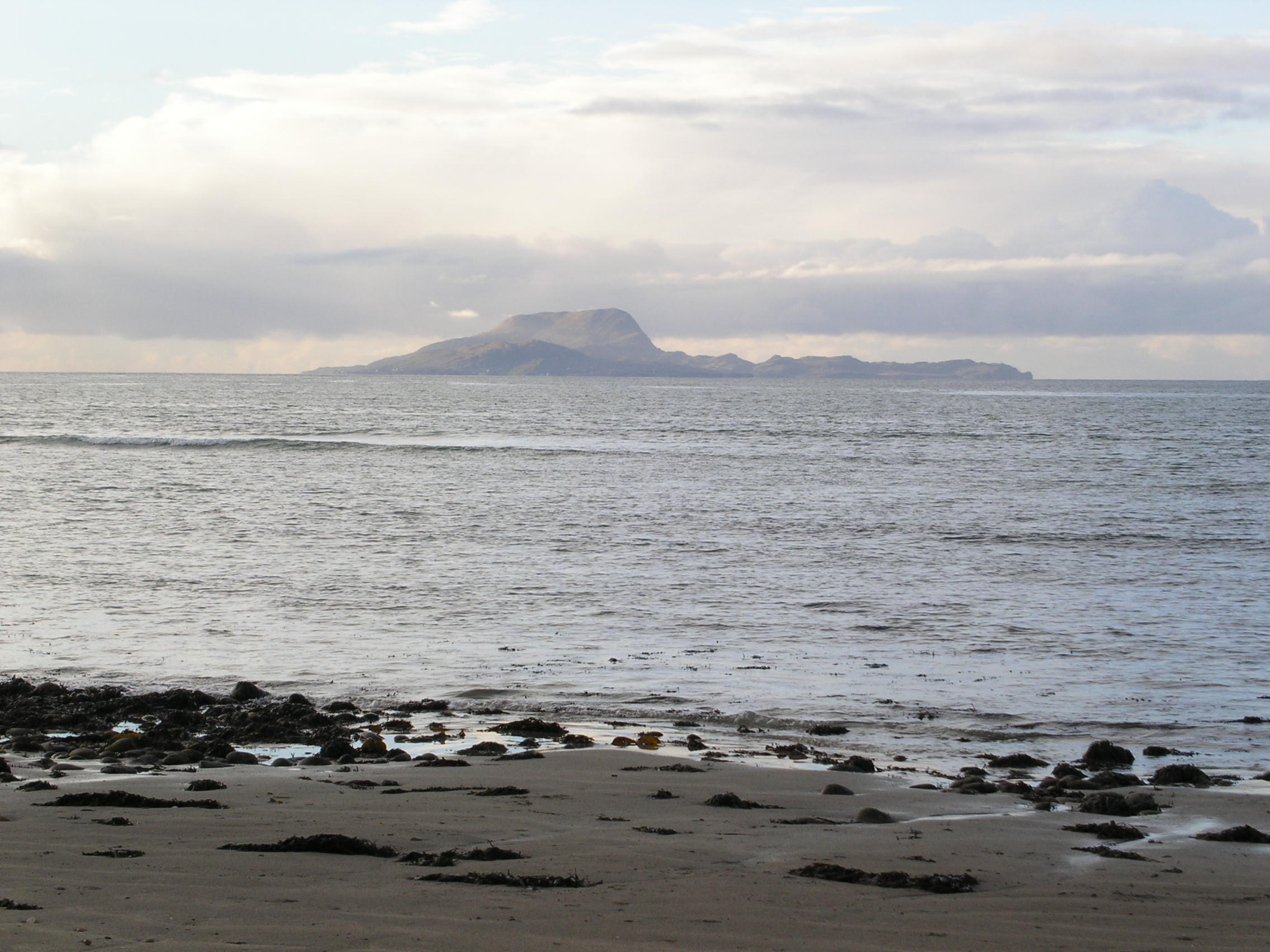
- Clare Island from Clew Bay

- Location in Ireland

Geography
- Location: Atlantic Ocean
- Coordinates: 53.°48.13′N 9°59.17′W
- Archipelago: Clew Bay
- Total islands: 141
- Area: 4,053 acres (1,640 ha)
- Coastline: 21 km (13 mi)
- Highest elevation: 462 m (1516 ft)
- Highest point: Knockmore

Administration
- Ireland
- Province: Connacht
- County: Mayo

Demographics
- Population: 138 (2022)
- Pop. density: 7.8/km^{2} (20.2/sq mi)

Clare Island (Irish: Cliara or Oileán Chliara), also historically Inishcleer, is a mountainous island guarding the entrance to Clew Bay in County Mayo, Ireland. Historically part of the kingdom of Umhaill, it is famous as the home of the 16th century pirate queen Gráinne O'Malley. The population of the island is 138 according to the 2022 census. To the south-west lies Inishturk (inhabited) and Caher Island (uninhabited), and to the north is Achill Island.

== History ==
Through the Middle Ages, Clare Island was part of the lands of the O'Malley family. The ruins of an O'Malley tower-house, known as Granuaile's Castle because of its most famous resident, are close to the pier at the eastern edge of the island. Clare Island Abbey near the south coast of the island was founded by the O'Malleys and contains the O'Malley Tomb, a possible burial site of Gráinne O'Malley. The Abbey is known for its rare medieval roof paintings. In 1588, a ship from the Spanish Armada was wrecked on Clare Island and its men were killed by the O'Malleys.

A very prominent landmark of the island is the Clare Island Lighthouse, established by John Denis Browne, the 1st Marquess of Sligo, in 1806. On 29 September 1813 a fire, caused by careless disposal of the oil-lamp wicks, destroyed part of the tower and the lantern. The rebuilt light was ready in 1818. In 1834, the tower was struck by lightning. The lighthouse was decommissioned on 28 September 1965, replaced by the modern Achillbeg Island lighthouse on the south side of Achill Island.

Clare Island Lighthouse has been refurbished and is now an upmarket guesthouse, while its optic is on permanent rotating display at the World of Glass museum and visitor centre in North West England.

=== Demographics ===
The table below reports data on Clare Island's population taken from Discover the Islands of Ireland (Alex Ritsema, Collins Press, 1999) and the Census of Ireland.

Historical population

Year	Pop.	±%
1841	1,615	—
1851	845	−47.7%
1861	716	−15.3%
1871	494	−31.0%
1881	621	+25.7%
1891	557	−10.3%
1901	490	−12.0%
1911	460	−6.1%
1926	378	−17.8%

Year	Pop.	±%
1936	361	−4.5%
1946	310	−14.1%
1951	278	−10.3%
1956	239	−14.0%
1961	205	−14.2%
1966	167	−18.5%
1971	168	+0.6%
1979	132	−21.4%
1981	127	−3.8%

Year	Pop.	±%
1986	140	+10.2%
1991	137	−2.1%
1996	136	−0.7%
2002	127	−6.6%
2006	136	+7.1%
2011	168	+23.5%
2016	159	−5.4%
2022	138	−13.2%

Source: Central Statistics Office. "CNA17: Population by Off Shore Island, Sex and Year". CSO.ie.

== Fauna and flora ==
Between 1909 and 1911, the Belfast naturalist Robert Lloyd Praeger led an exhaustive biological survey of the island, the Clare Island Survey, which was unprecedented at the time and served as a template for future studies. A new study of the island was made in 1990 to 2005 and the results were published in six volumes, the last of which was published in 2007. This is reputedly the only survey of its kind in Europe and is serving as a model for measuring the effects of climate change on environment.

=== Algae ===
Three species of freshwater red algae have been recorded from Clare Island: Batrachospermum atrum (Hudson) Harvey, B. turfosum Bory and Lemanea fucina Bory.

== Transportation and infrastructure ==
Clare Island is accessible by daily ferry services from Roonagh Pier near Louisburgh. The island has a hostel, a few bed and breakfasts and a yoga and meditation centre. The island also has a bicycle rental facility.

The island has its own primary school and a post office. Children go to the mainland for secondary school education. The harbour, located on the SE of the island, offers good shelter in all winds with West in them, but is completely open to easterly winds. The piers are not suitable for yachts to come alongside but in the summer Mayo county council maintains a number of moorings for visiting yachts. The inner harbour dries out with a sandy bottom.

== Culture ==
The island features in the song "Clare Island" by the Irish folk-rock band, the Saw Doctors from their 1996 album, Same Oul' Town. In the song, the island is described as a haven from hectic city life. It is also mentioned in the lyrics of the song "The Green and Red of Mayo".

Clare Island is the setting for Bob Quinn's film Budawanny (1987). He also shot a documentary on Clare Island, titled The Island, in 1966.

Clare Island is the setting for the Michael Morpurgo book The Ghost of Grania O'Malley.

The Clare Island Film Festival has been run annually since 2014.

== Gallery ==
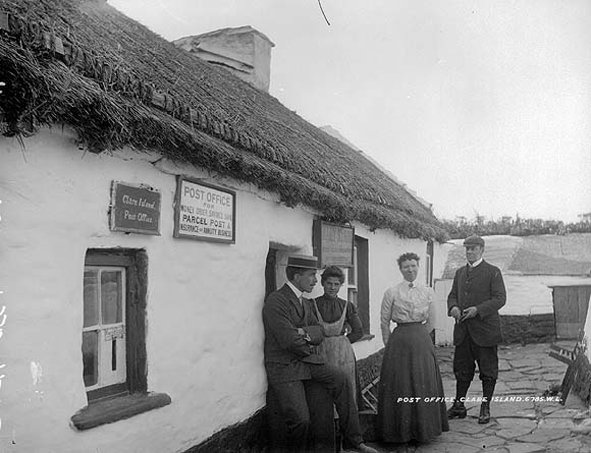
Post office c. 1900

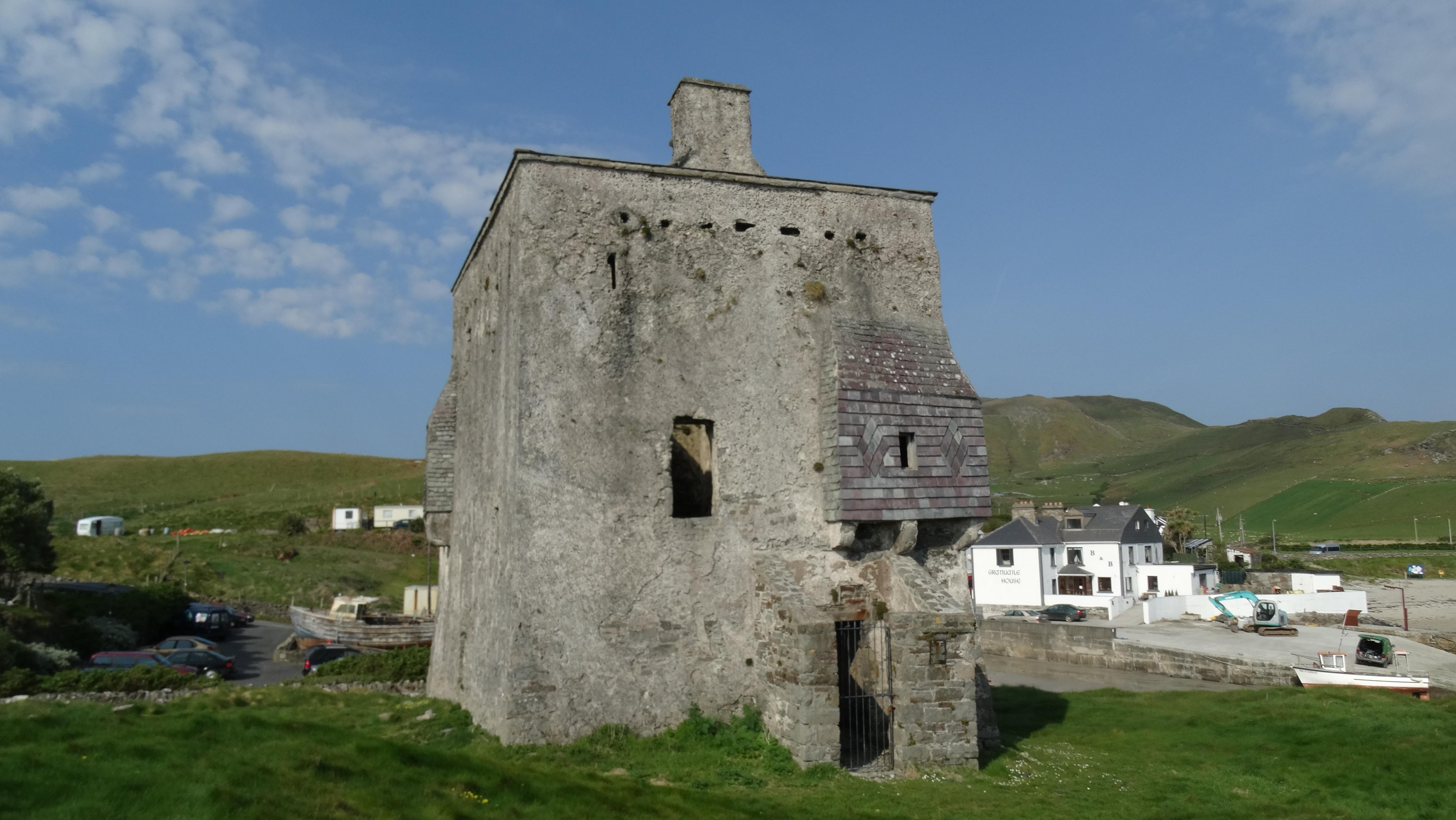
Granuaile's Castle

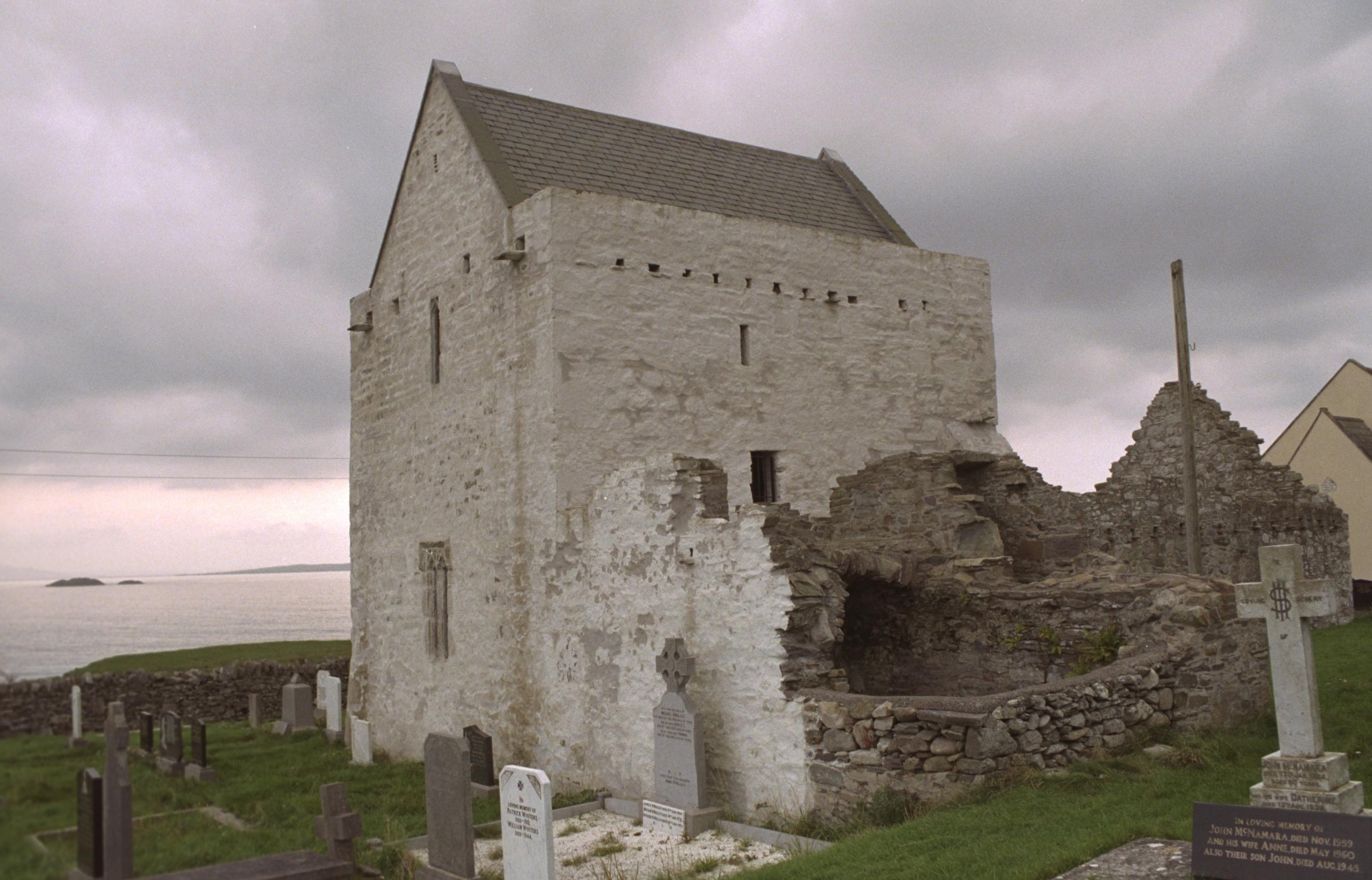
Clare Island Abbey

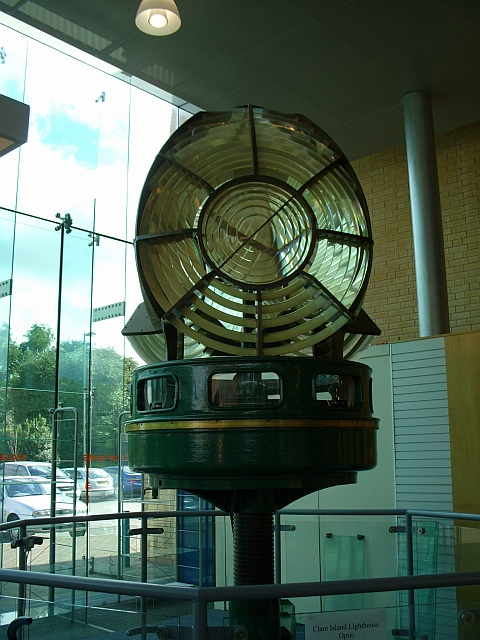
The optic from the Clare Island lighthouse, now on permanent rotating display at the World of Glass museum in St Helens, England

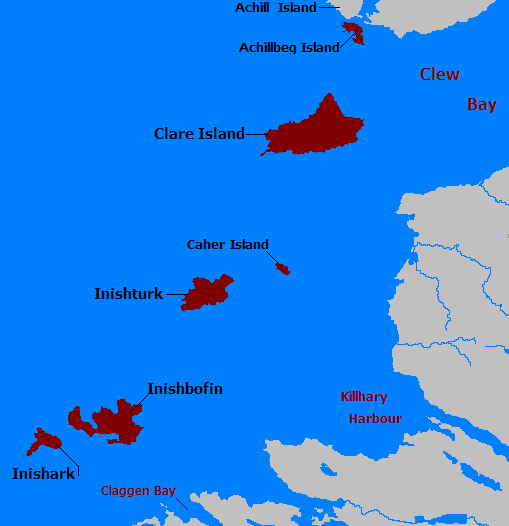
Islands off County Mayo

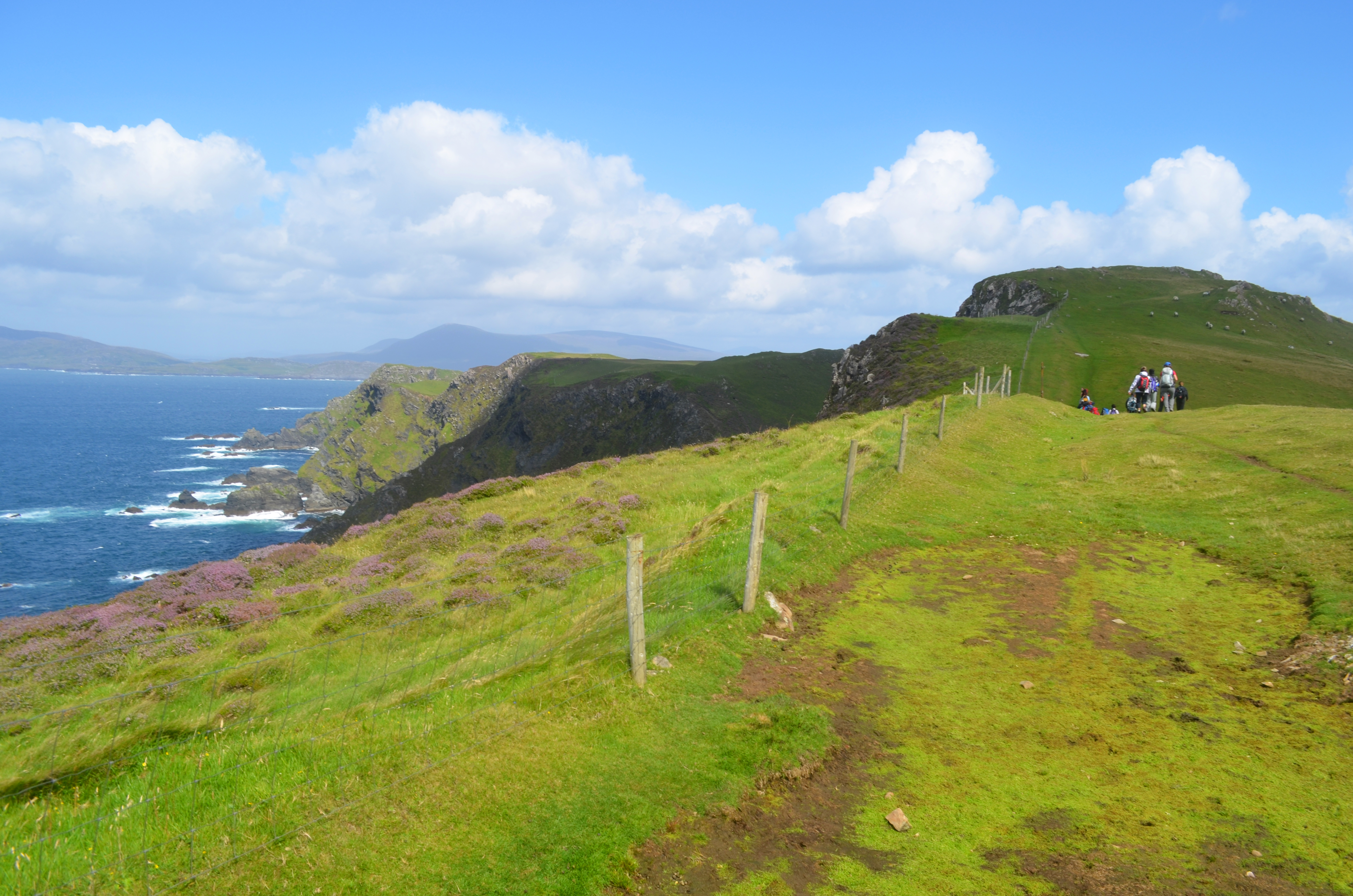
Visiting Clare Island

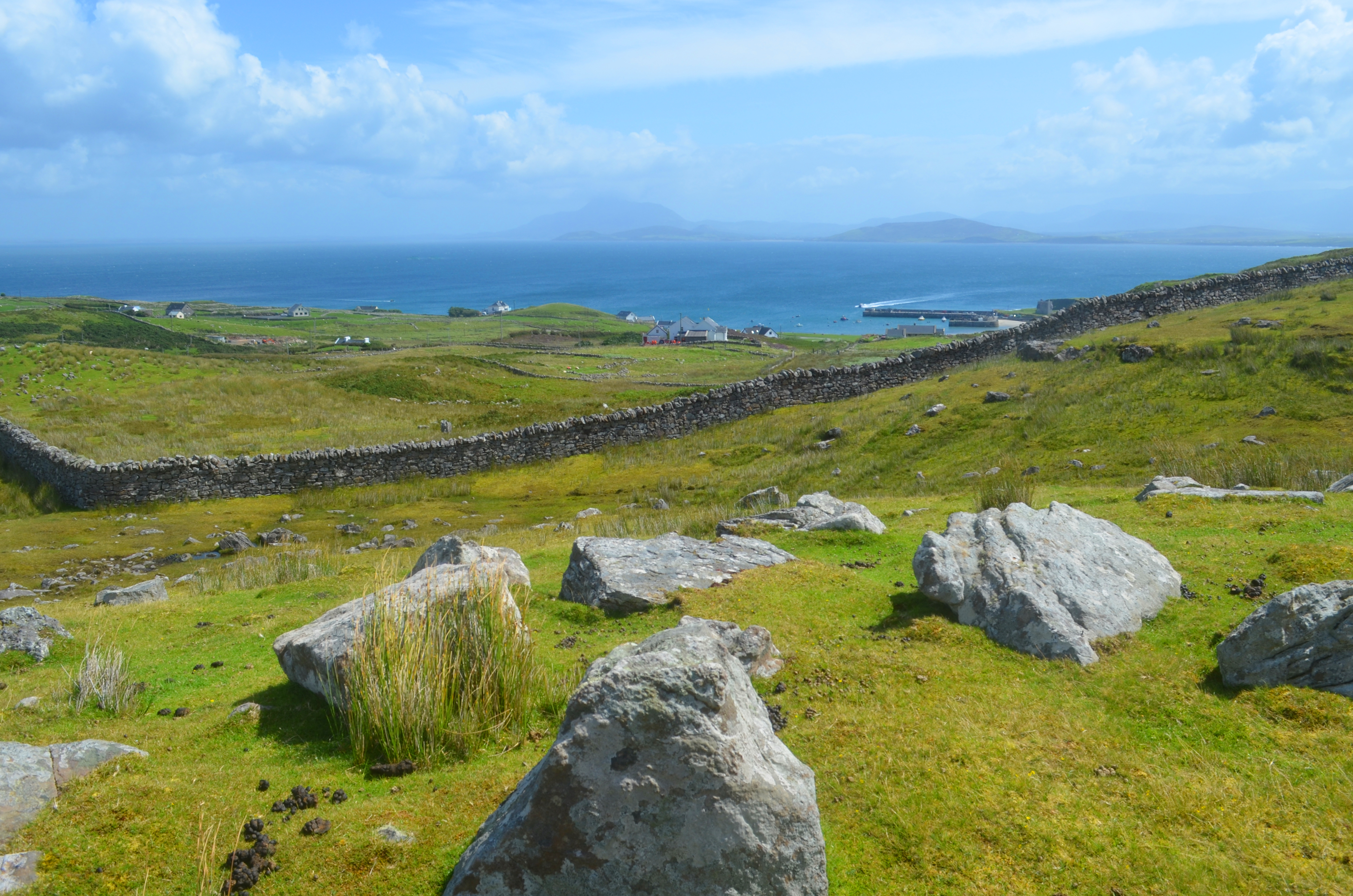
Visiting Clare Island

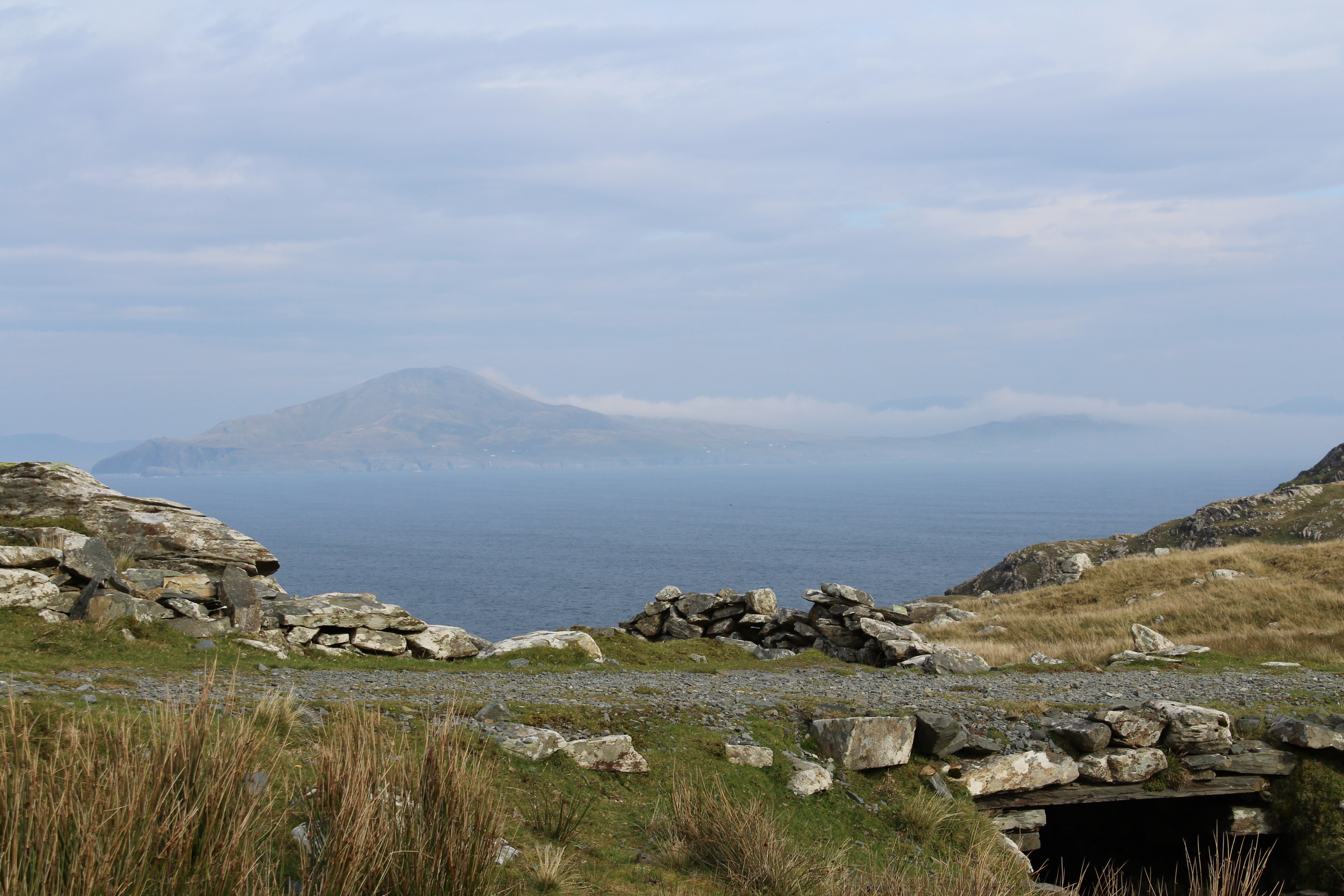
Clare Island as seen from Inishturk

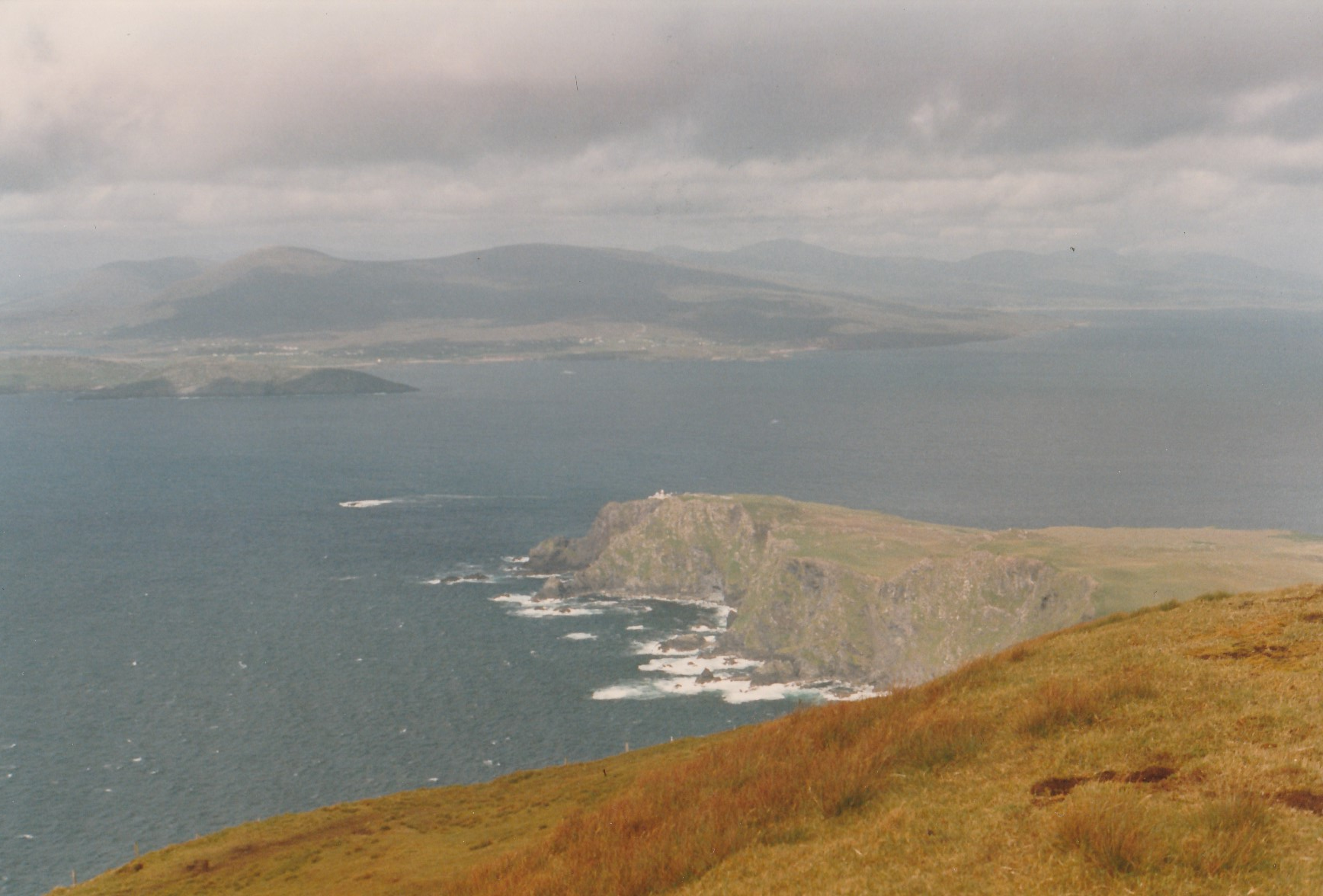
Looking across to Achillbeg from a height on Clare Island

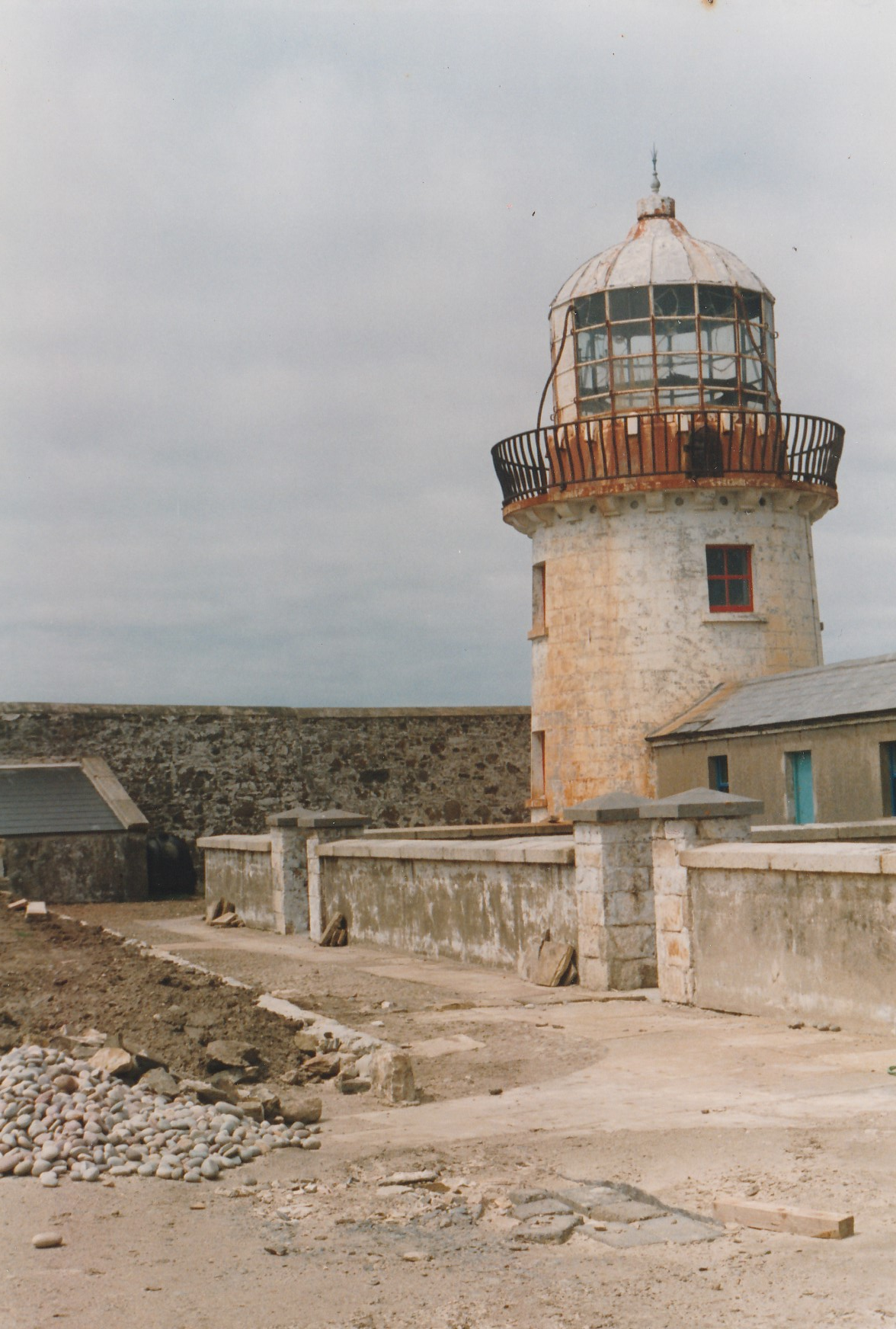
Clare Island lighthouse under renovation in 1994

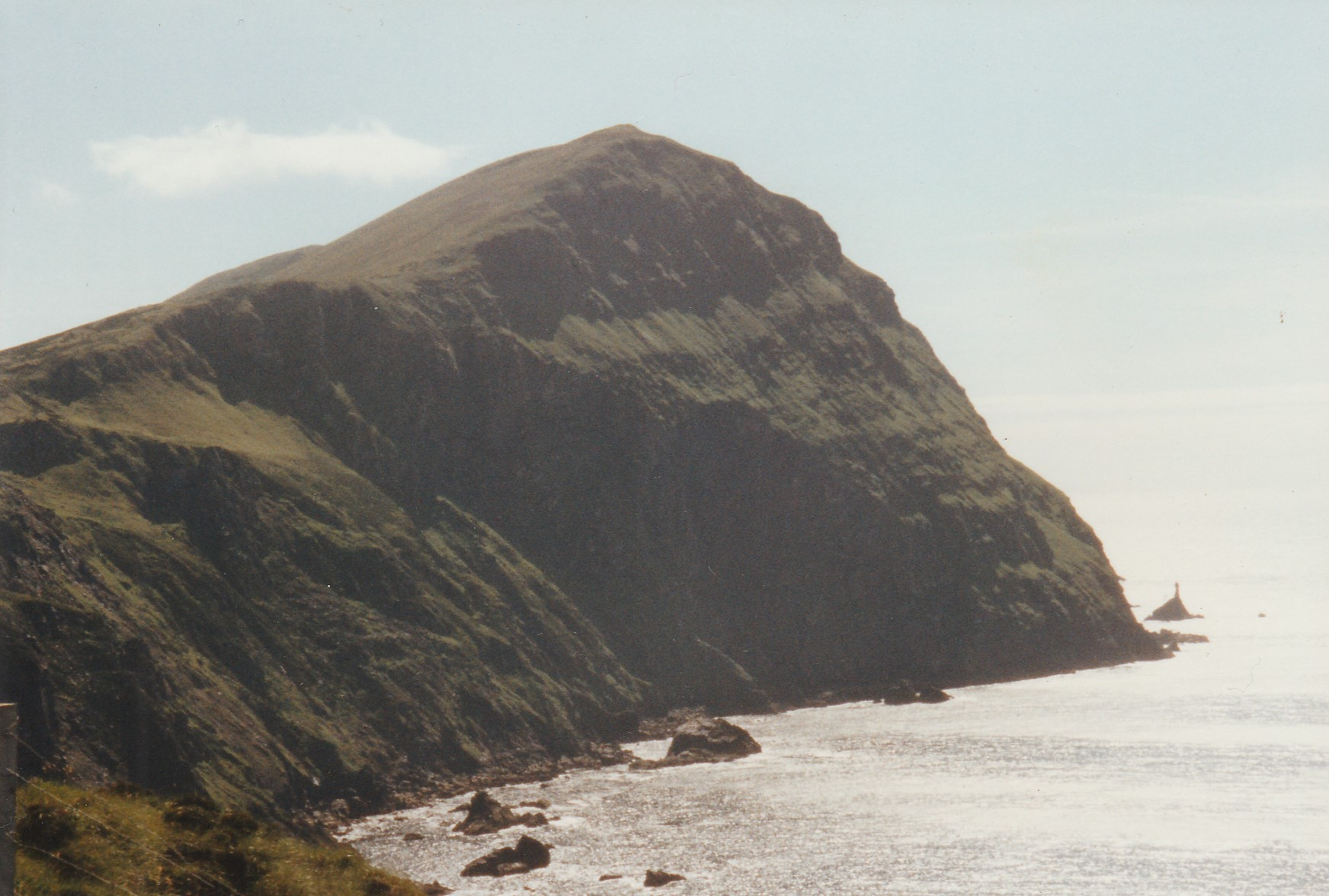
Cliffs on the northern side of the island

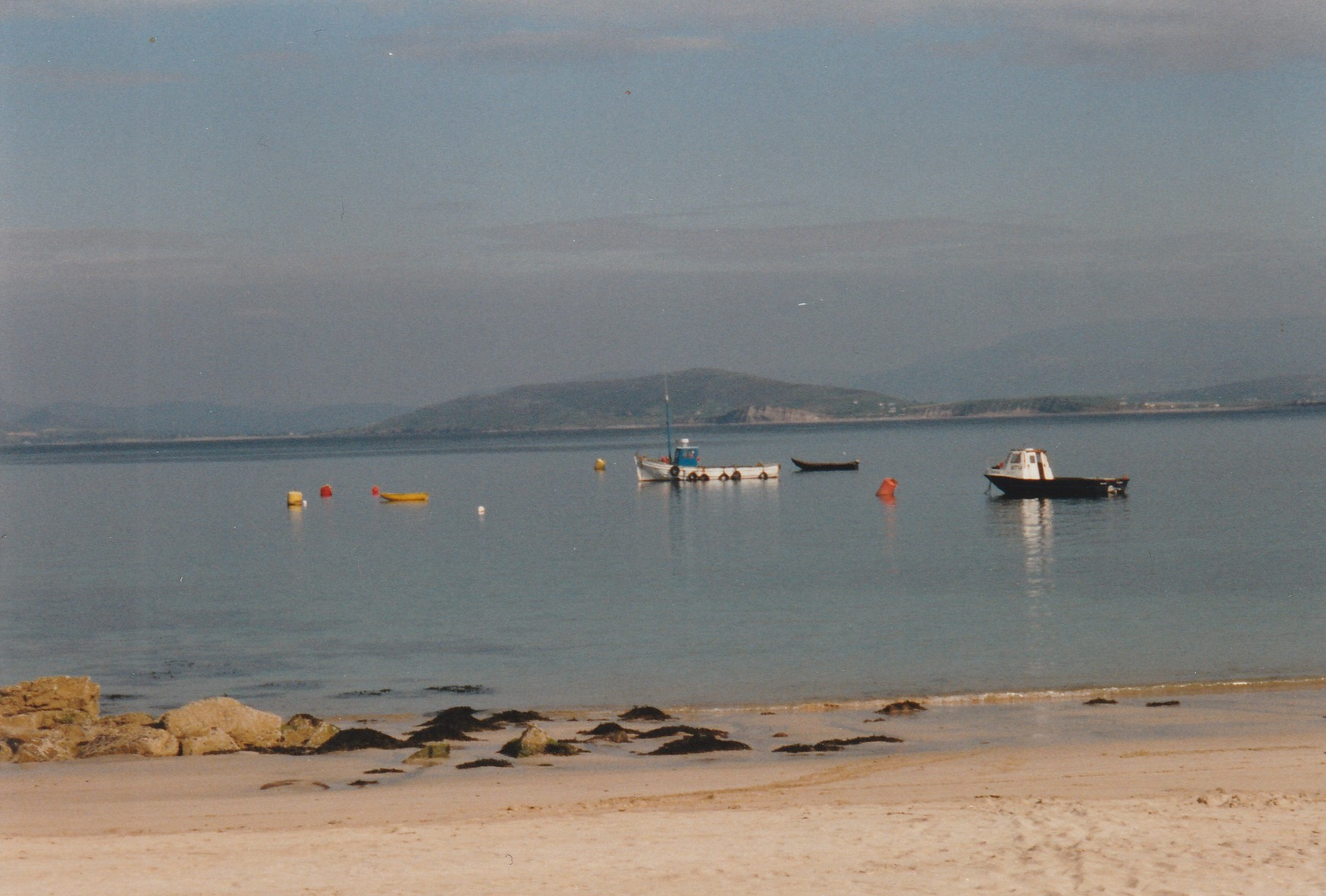
The beach during calm weather

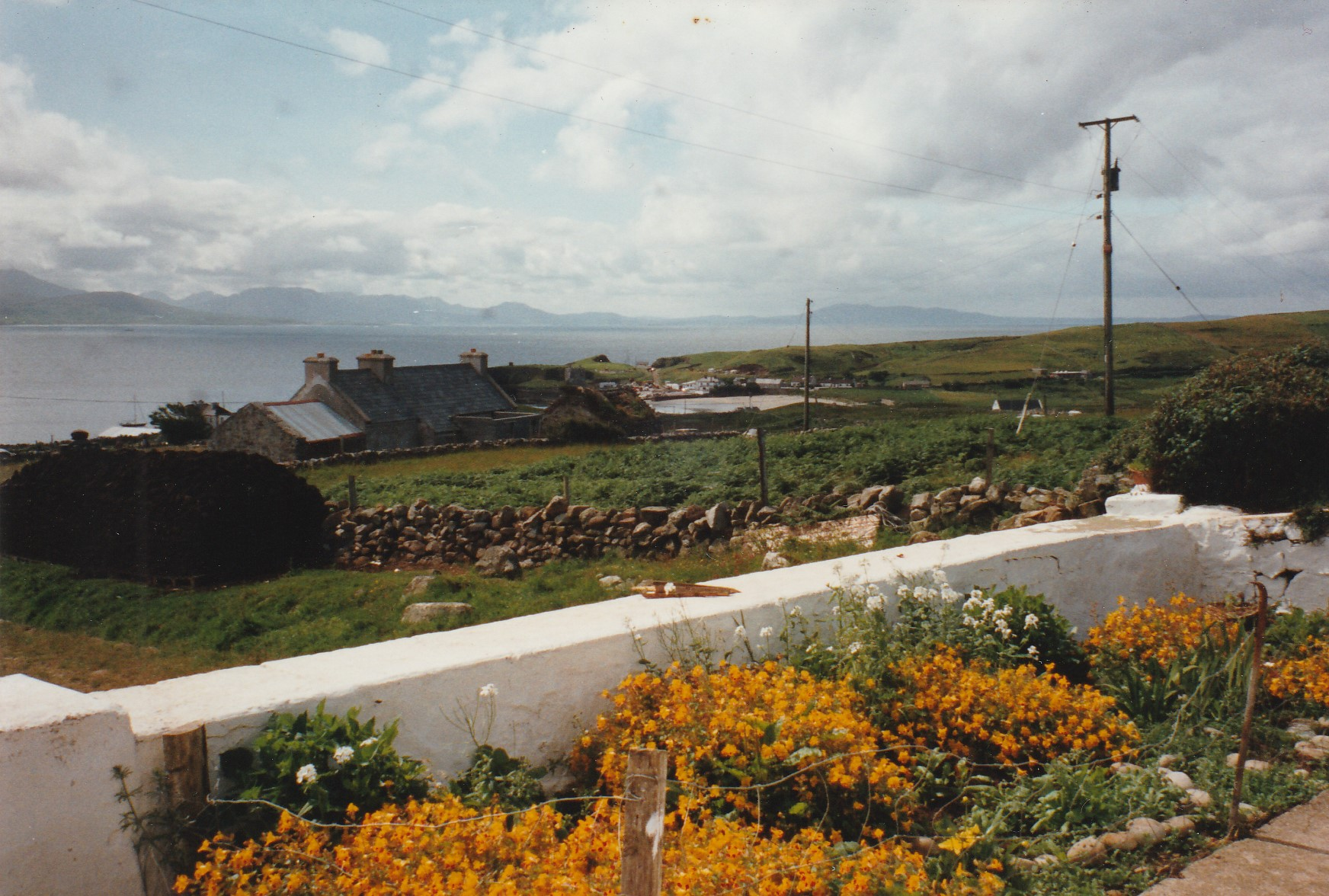
Looking towards the pier in 1994 (Note: turf pile to left of photo)

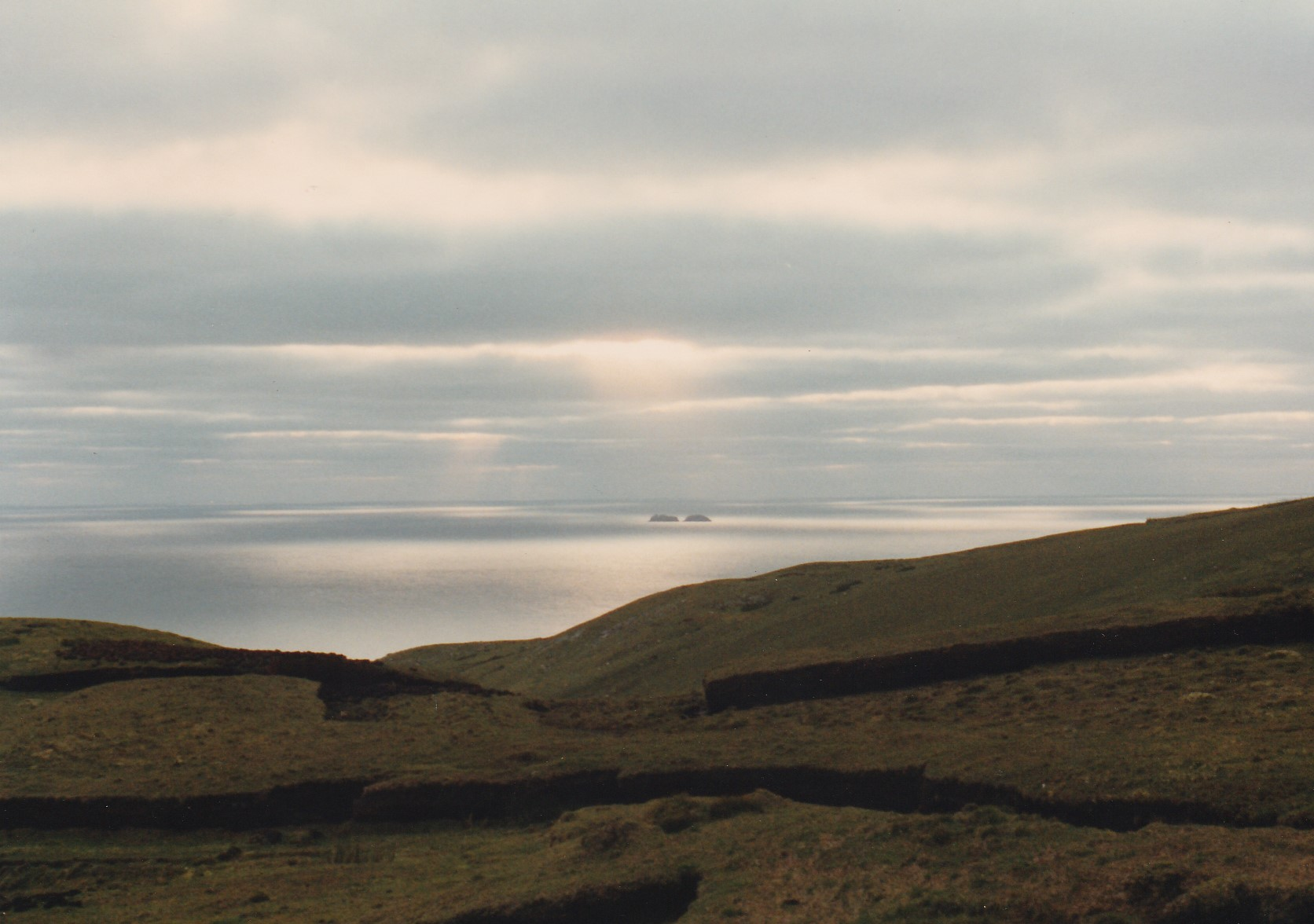
Peat banks on the island with the Mweelaun Islands beyond

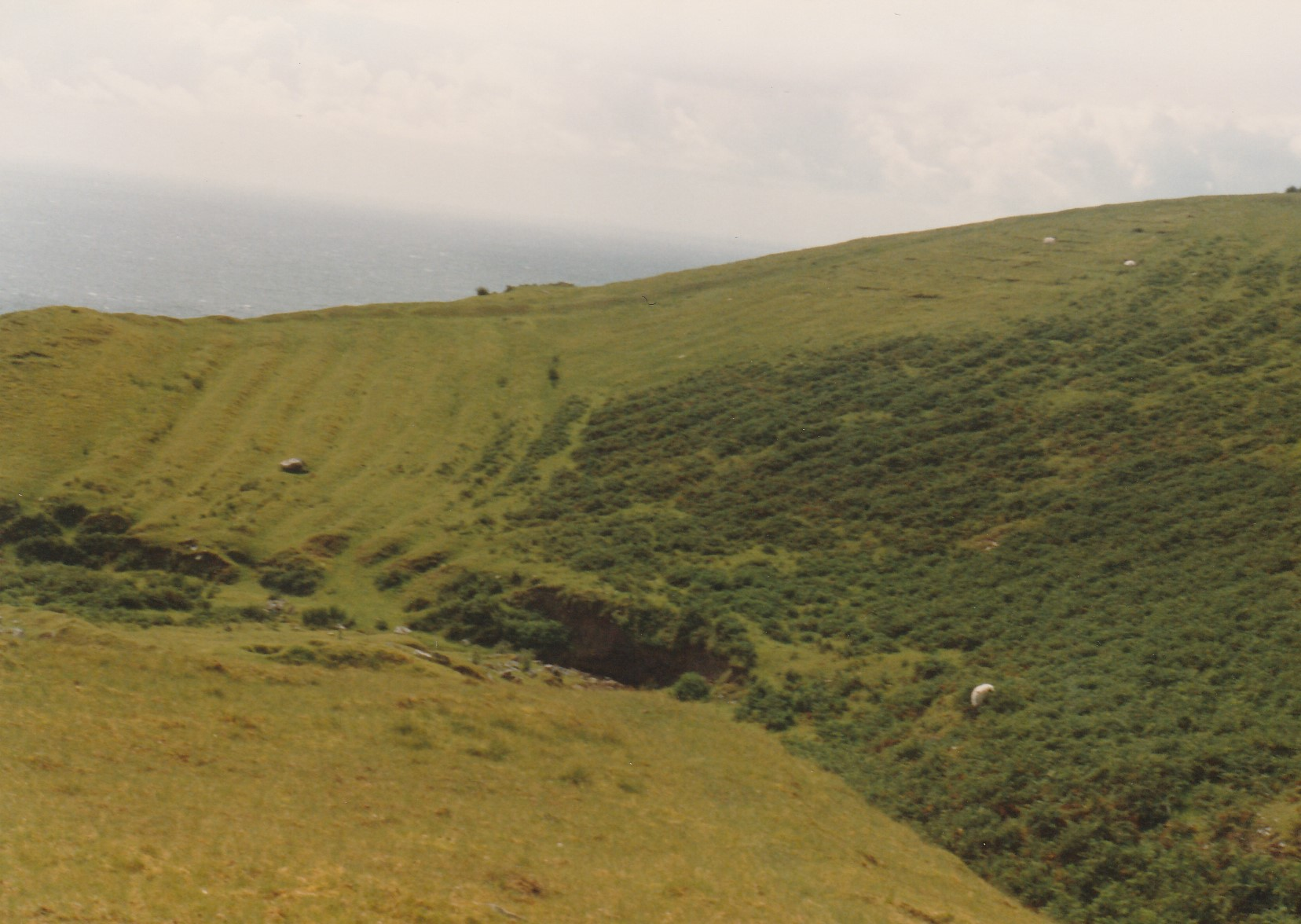
Lazy beds on the island

== See also ==
- Caher Island, a much smaller, uninhabited island 8 km to the south
- Inishturk, a smaller island 9 km to the south-west
