= Inishturk =

Island in County Mayo, Ireland

Native name: Inis Toirc
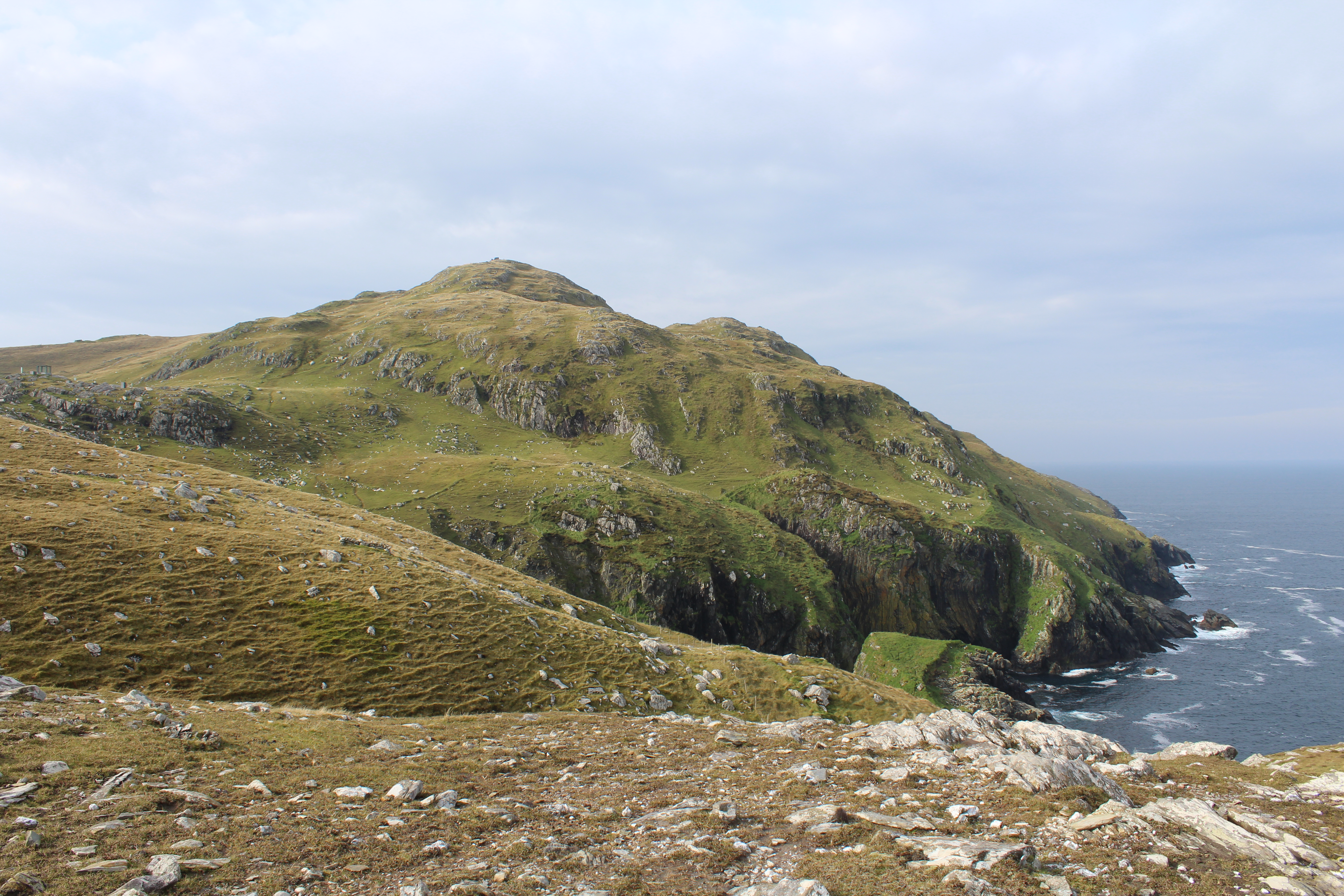
- North coast of Inishturk

- Location within island of Ireland

Geography
- Location: Atlantic Ocean
- Coordinates: 53.7014°N 10.1083°W
- Area: 6 km^{2} (2.3 sq mi)
- Highest elevation: 189.3 m (621.1 ft)

Administration
- Ireland
- Province: Connacht
- County: Mayo

Demographics
- Population: 56 (2022)
- Pop. density: 8.5/km^{2} (22/sq mi)
- Ethnic groups: Irish

Inishturk (Inis Toirc in Irish, meaning Wild Boar Island) is an inhabited island of County Mayo, in Ireland.

== Geography ==
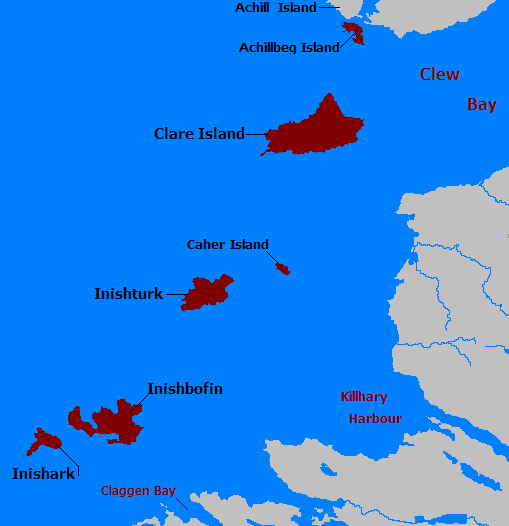
Islands off County Mayo

The island lies about 15 km (9 mi) off the coast; its highest point reaches 189.3 m (621.1 ft) above sea level. Between Inisturk and Clare Island lies Caher Island. It has a permanent population of 58 people. The main settlements, Ballyheer, Garranty, Bellavaun and Craggy are all on the more sheltered southern and eastern sides of the island.

== History ==
Inishturk has been inhabited on and off since 4,000 BCE and has been inhabited permanently since at least 1700. Some of the island's more recent inhabitants are descended from evacuees from Inishark to the southwest.

A Martello tower was built during the Napoleonic Wars, c. 1805, on Inishturk's western coast.

=== Recent history ===
In 1993, Inishturk Community centre was opened, this community centre doubles as a library and a pub. In June 2014 the ESB commissioned three new Broadcrown BCP 110-50 100kVA diesel generators to supply electricity to the island. The ESB have operated a diesel power station on the island since the 1980s.

Inishturk gained international attention in 2016 after a number of websites claimed that the island would welcome any American "refugees" fleeing a potential Donald Trump presidency.

The island is home to a primary school on the island which in 2011 had only 3 pupils; this is believed to be the smallest primary school in Ireland.

In May 2025, a new helipad was opened on the island, allowing for quick evacuations by helicopter in the event of an emergency.

In May 2026, Ireland's "first dedicated native honey bee sanctuary" was established on the island.

=== Demographics ===
The table below reports data on Inisturk's population taken from Discover the Islands of Ireland (Alex Ritsema, Collins Press, 1999) and the Census of Ireland.

Historical population

Year	Pop.	±%
1841	577	—
1851	174	−69.8%
1861	110	−36.8%
1871	112	+1.8%
1881	116	+3.6%
1891	135	+16.4%
1901	135	+0.0%
1911	132	−2.2%
1926	101	−23.5%

Year	Pop.	±%
1936	107	+5.9%
1946	125	+16.8%
1951	123	−1.6%
1956	110	−10.6%
1961	108	−1.8%
1966	92	−14.8%
1971	83	−9.8%
1979	85	+2.4%
1981	76	−10.6%

Year	Pop.	±%
1986	90	+18.4%
1991	78	−13.3%
1996	83	+6.4%
2002	72	−13.3%
2006	58	−19.4%
2011	53	−8.6%
2016	51	−3.8%
2022	56	+9.8%

Source: Central Statistics Office. "CNA17: Population by Off Shore Island, Sex and Year". CSO.ie.

== Transport ==
Prior to 1997 there was no scheduled ferry service and people traveled to and from the islands using local fishing boats. Since then a ferry service operates from Roonagh Quay, Louisburgh, County Mayo. The pier was constructed during the 1980s by the Irish government, around this time the roads on the island were paved.

== Gallery ==
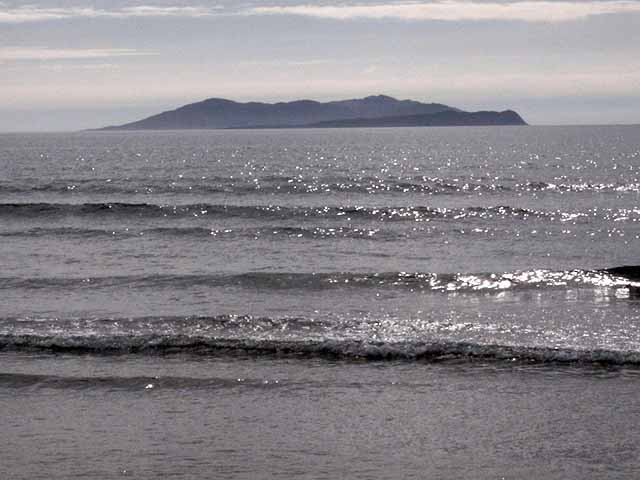
Inisturk and Caher island

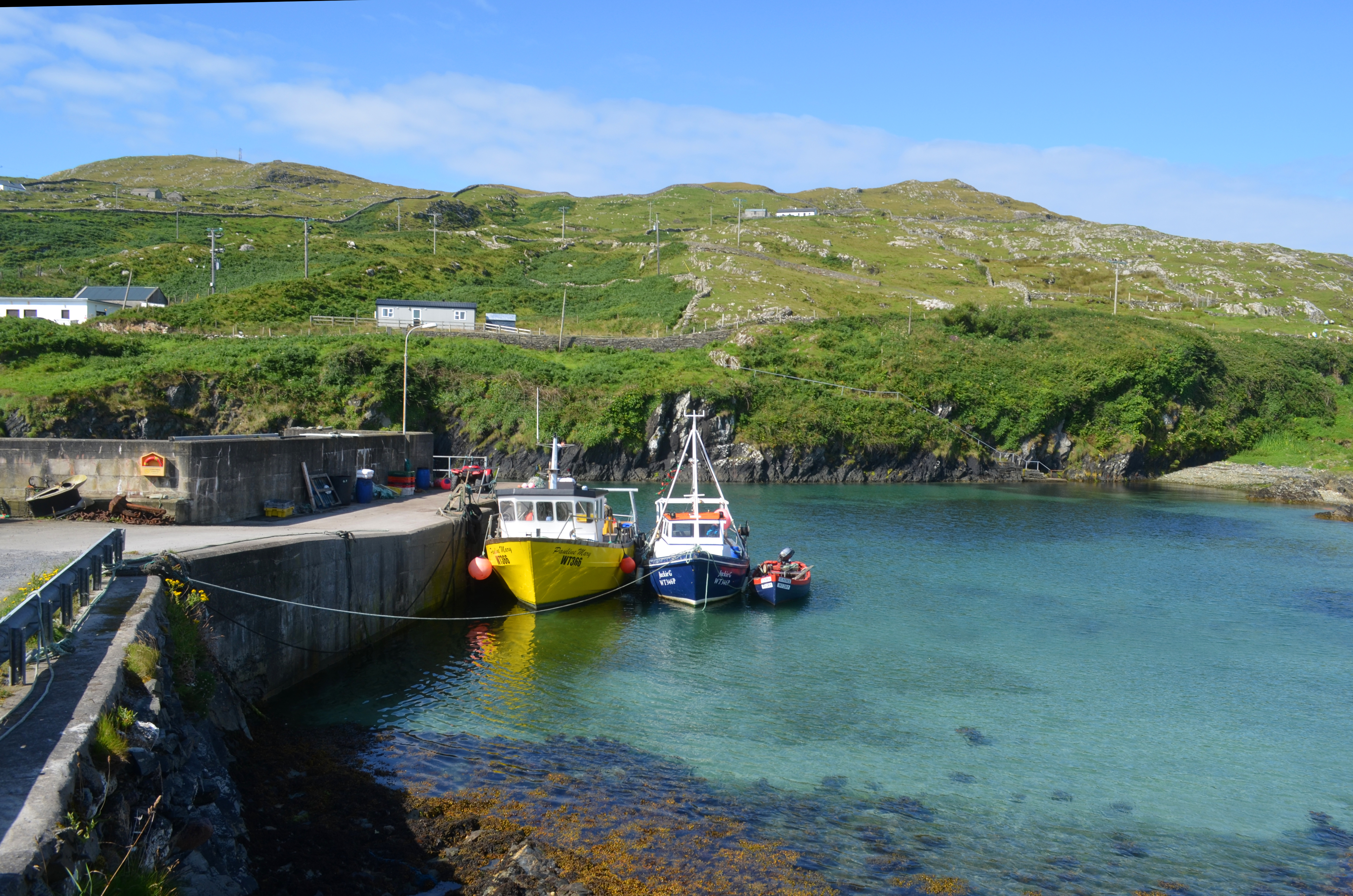
Inishturk pier

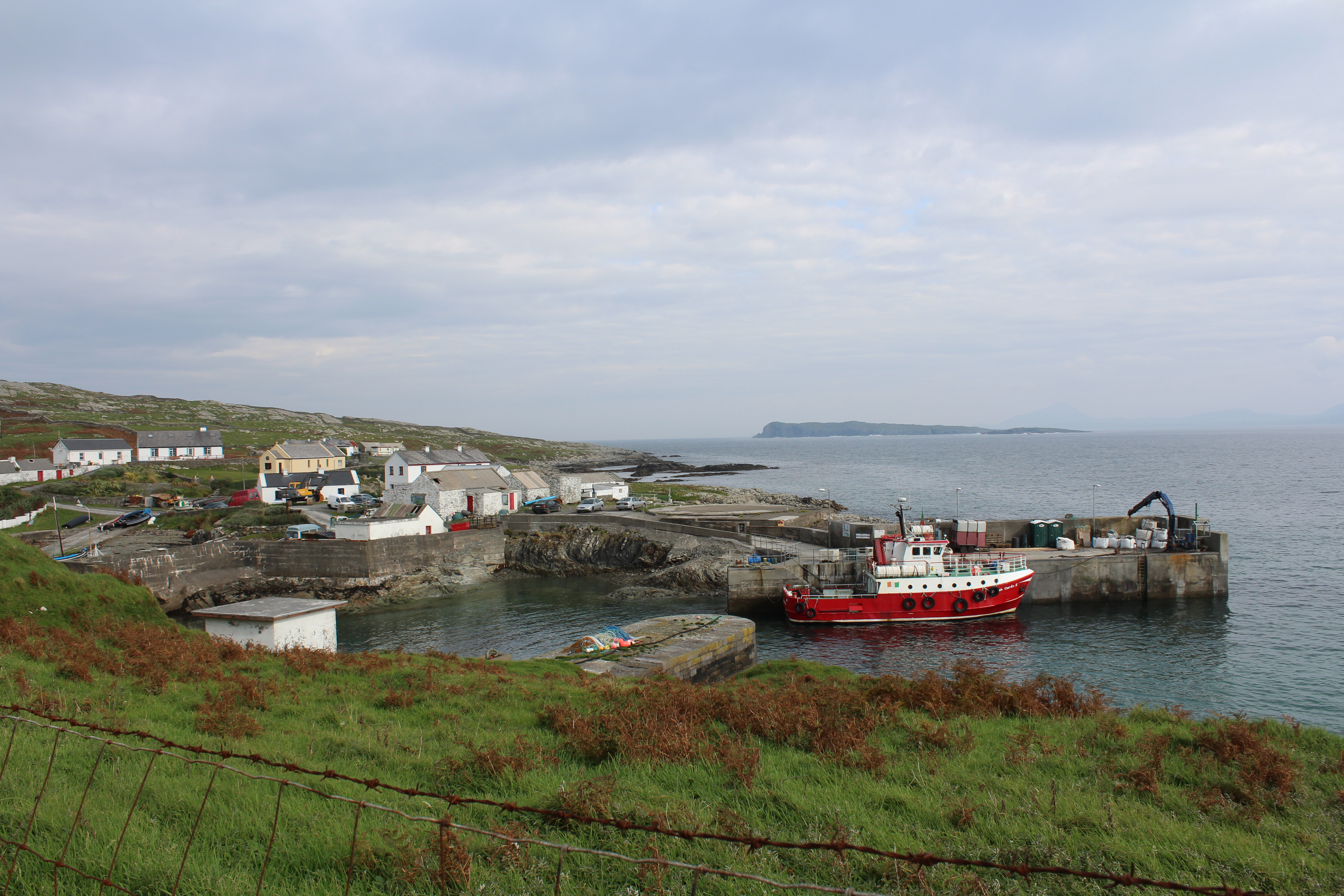
Harbour with Caher Island in background

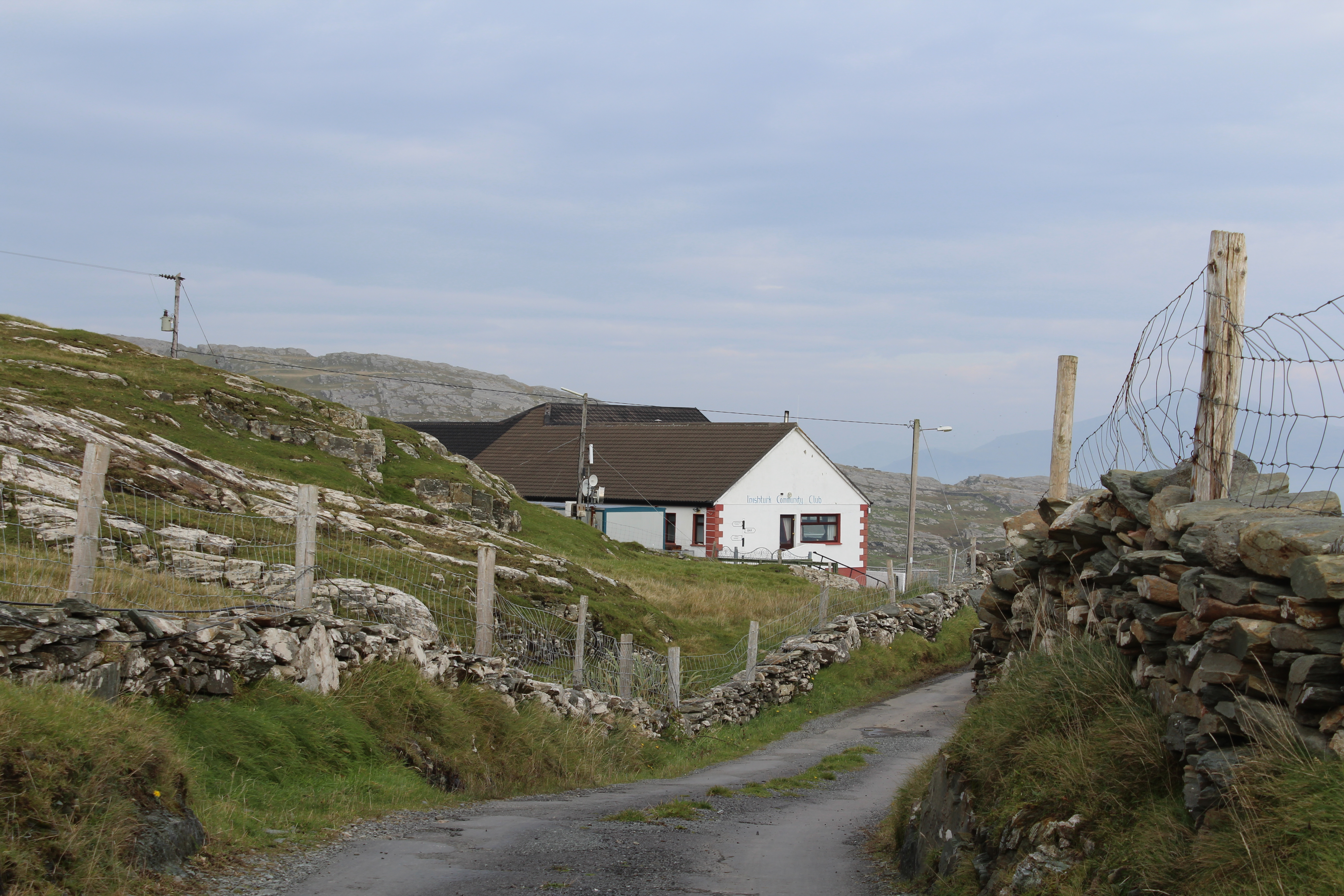
Community centre

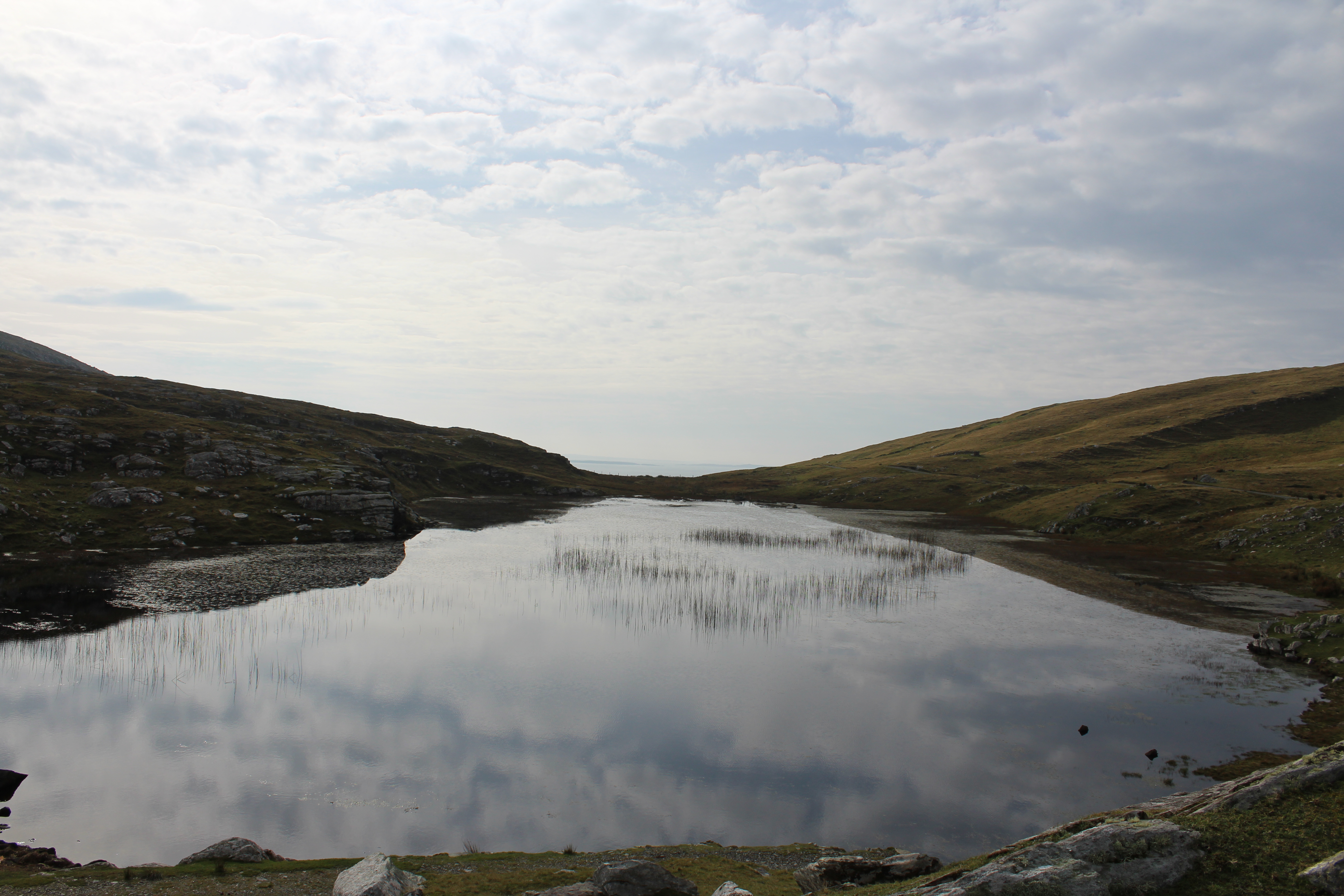
Freshwater lake

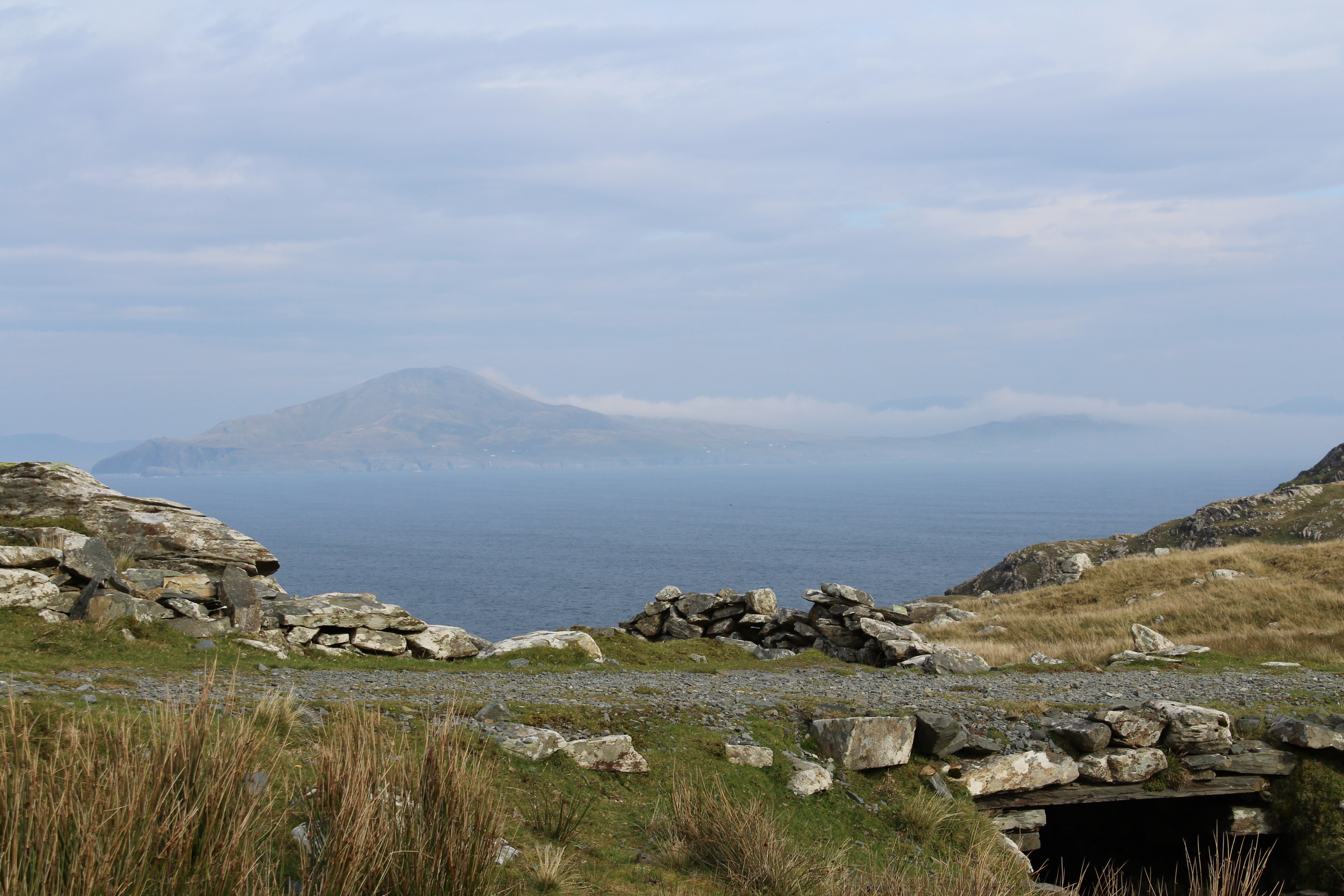
Clare Island as seen from Inishturk

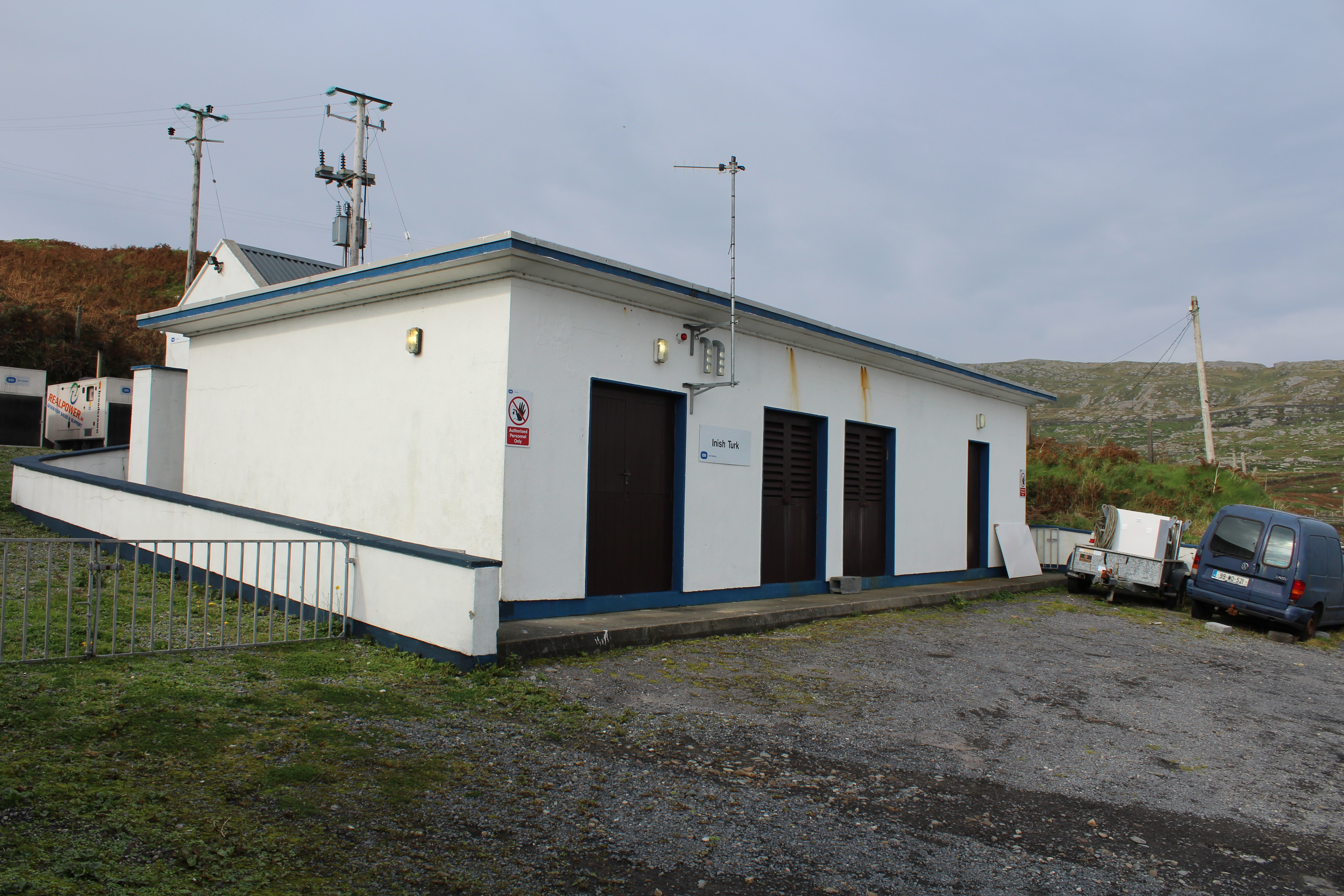
Power station

== See also ==
- Inishdalla
- Inishbofin, County Galway
- List of islands of Ireland
