= Granuaile's Castle =

- Caisleán Ghráinne (Irish)
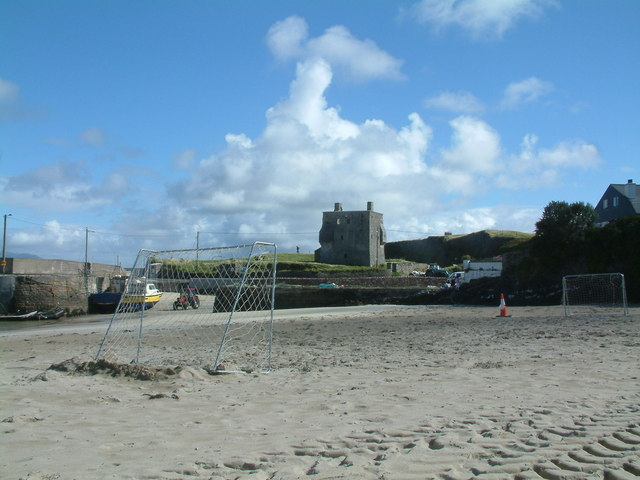

- Location within Ireland
- 53.799753°N 9.951312°W
- Type: tower house
- Location: Glen, Clare Island, County Mayo, Ireland

History
- Built: 16th century

Site notes
- Height: 12 m (39 ft)
- Owner: State

National monument of Ireland
- Official name: Granuaile's Castle
- Reference no.: 198

Granuaile's Castle is a tower house and National Monument located in Clare Island, Ireland.

== Location ==
Granuaile's Castle is located on the east coast of Clare Island.

== History ==
Granuaile's Castle was built in the 16th century by the Ó Máille (O'Malley), Kings of Umaill. It was a stronghold of Gráinne Ní Mháille (Grace O'Malley, c. 1530 – c. 1603), the famous "pirate queen." Her other strongholds were at Rockfleet Castle (on Clew Bay) and Carrickkildavnet Castle.

In the 1820s the castle was converted into a police barracks, when the purple slate flashing was added to the two bartizans.

== Building ==
The main living room was at that first floor level with access to the bartizans and the garderobe.

== Gallery ==
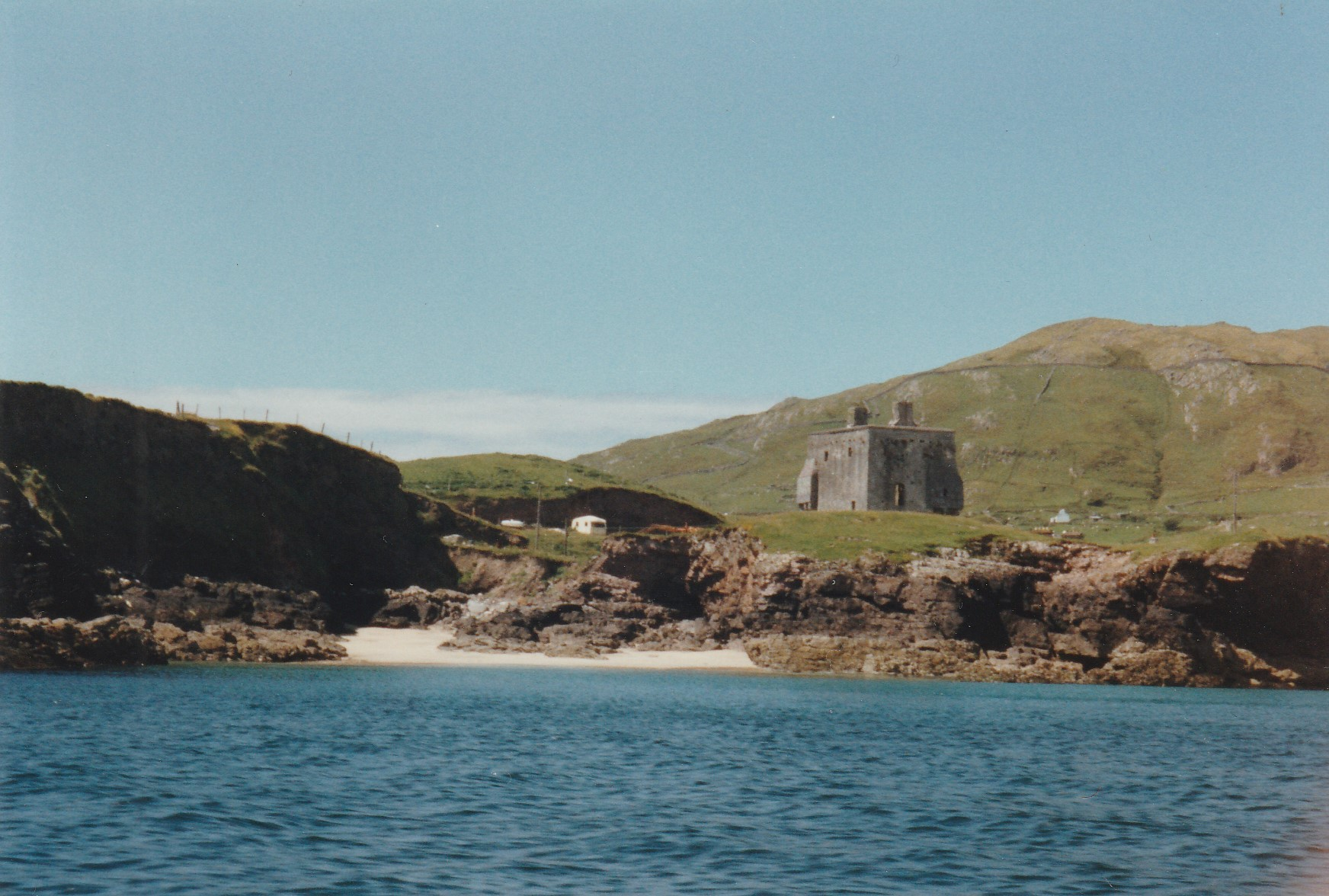
The castle in 1994

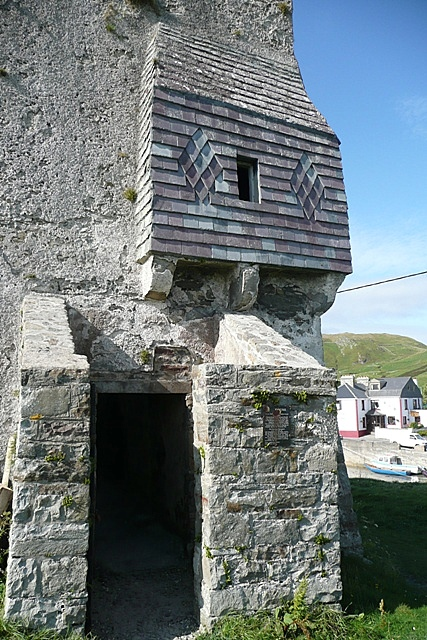
Castle exterior

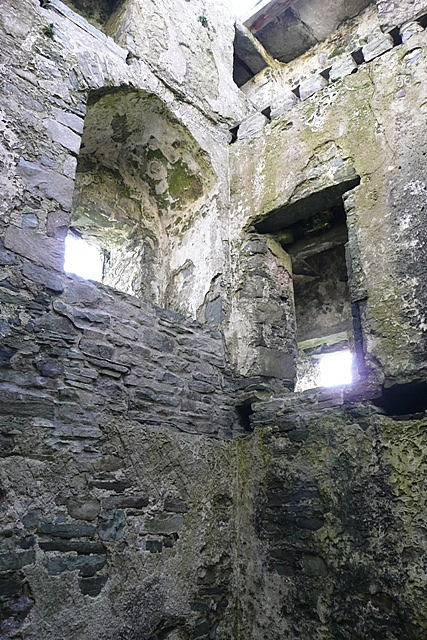
Castle interior
