= Caher Island =

Island off the coast of County Mayo, Ireland

Caher
Native name: Cathair na Naomh
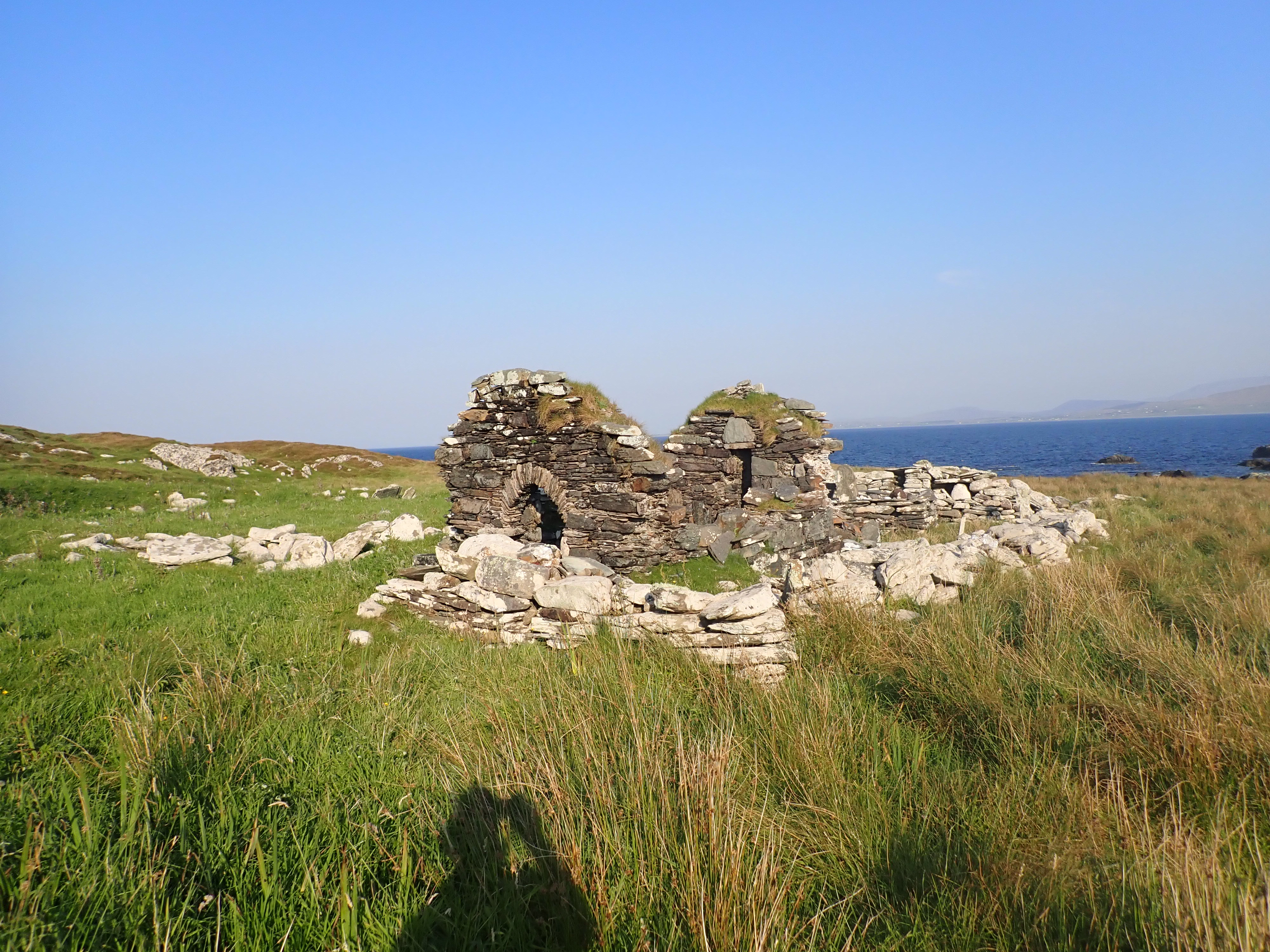
- Remains of a chapel on the island

- Location within island of Ireland

Geography
- Location: Atlantic Ocean
- Coordinates: 53.°43.3′N 10°1.38′W
- Archipelago: Clew Bay
- Total islands: 117
- Major islands: Clare Island, Inishturk, Inishbofin, Inishark, Achillbeg, Caher Island
- Area: 128 acres (52 ha)
- Highest elevation: 61 m (200 ft)
- Highest point: Unnamed Peak

Administration
- Ireland
- Province: Connacht
- County: Mayo

Demographics
- Population: 0
- Pop. density: 0/km^{2} (0/sq mi)

Caher Island (Cathair na Naomh in Irish), an uninhabited island off the coast of County Mayo in Ireland, is situated between the larger Clare Island and Inishturk.

== Etymology ==
Cathair na Naomh in Irish means the City of the Saints.

== History ==
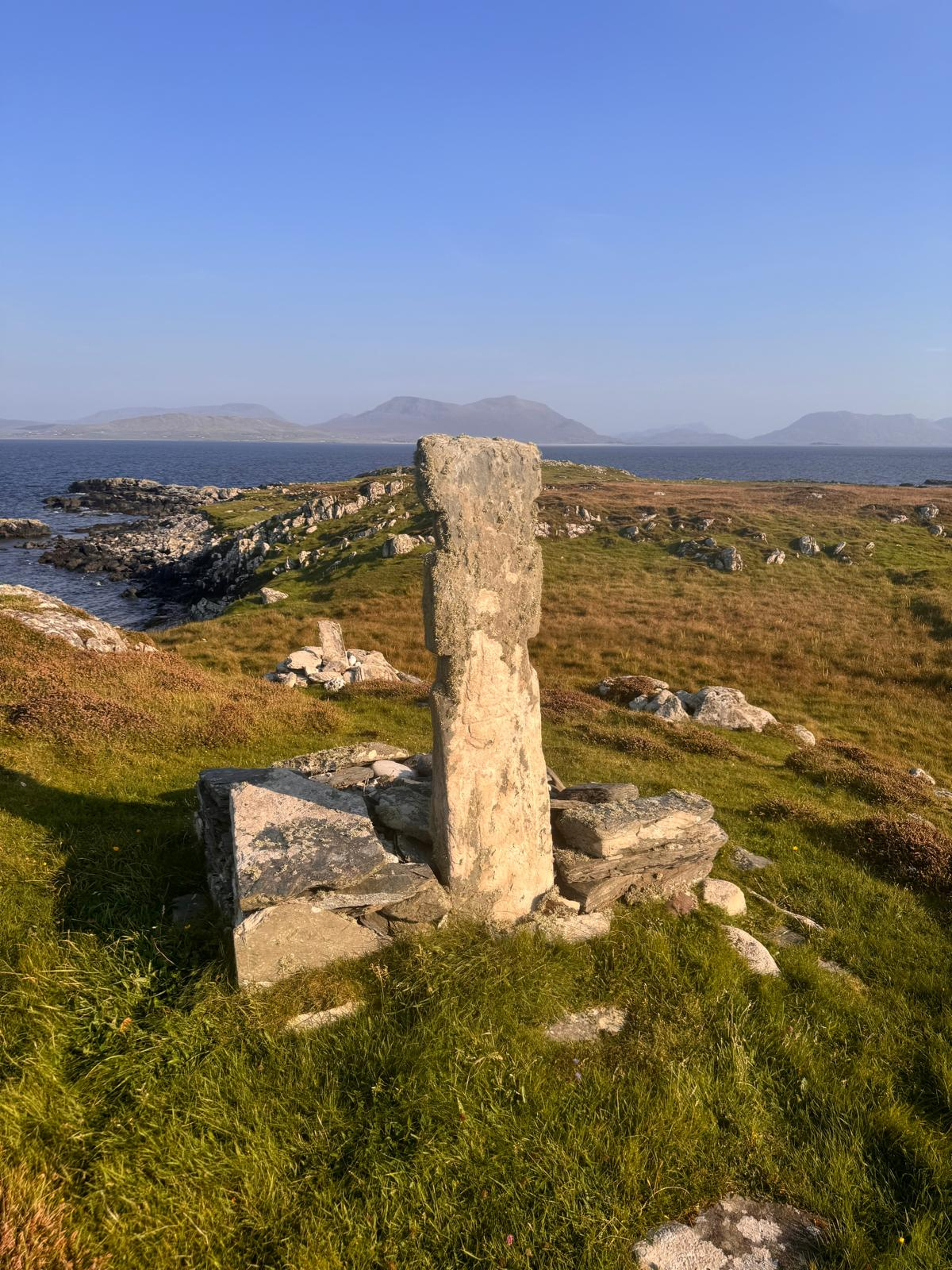
One of the crosses on the island

An ancient centre for pilgrimage, it is still visited for this reason today. On 15 August each year, the Feast of the Assumption, there is a pilgrimage to the island.

The island has an Early Christian monastery with the remains of a chapel in an enclosure and several carved slabs. The island appears to hold the remains of hermitages of seventh century monks.

After being widowed in 1565, the legendary pirate queen and Irish clan leader Gráinne Mhaol (Grace O'Malley) allegedly took a shipwrecked sailor as her lover. The affair only lasted briefly as he was killed in a deliberate provocation by Clan MacMahon of Ballyvoy. Seeking vengeance, O'Malley attacked Clan MacMahon's stronghold of Doona Castle in Blacksod Bay and slew her lover's killers upon Caher Island. Her vengeance against Clan MacMahon earned Gráinne Mhaol the sinister nickname the 'Dark Lady of Doona'.

== Access to the island ==
The island is accessed by boat from Inishturk. Caher can only be accessed reasonably safely by approaching with a small boat, such as a currach, from the east to the point marked as Portatemple on the charts. This is not a safe harbour, as heavy Atlantic swells can break through even on rare calm days. The comment on the chart for the area, "The entire area of irregular depths up to 4 miles offshore between Clew Bay and Killary harbour 10 miles further south, breaks in bad weather" reflects the fact that even in moderate swell conditions of less than 5 metres, peaks can rise and break unexpectedly.

== Gallery ==
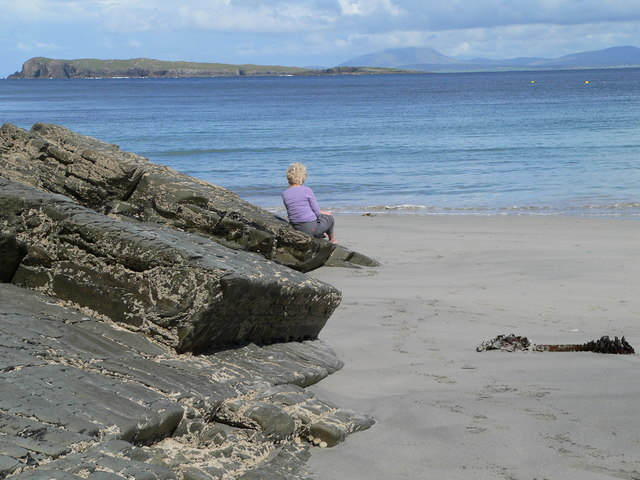
Looking towards Caher Island from Inishturk

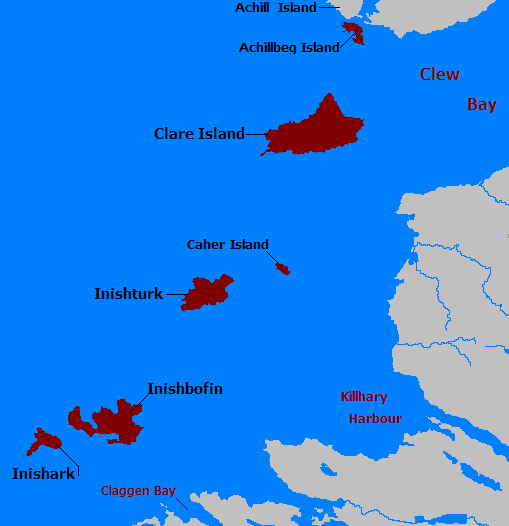
Islands off County Mayo

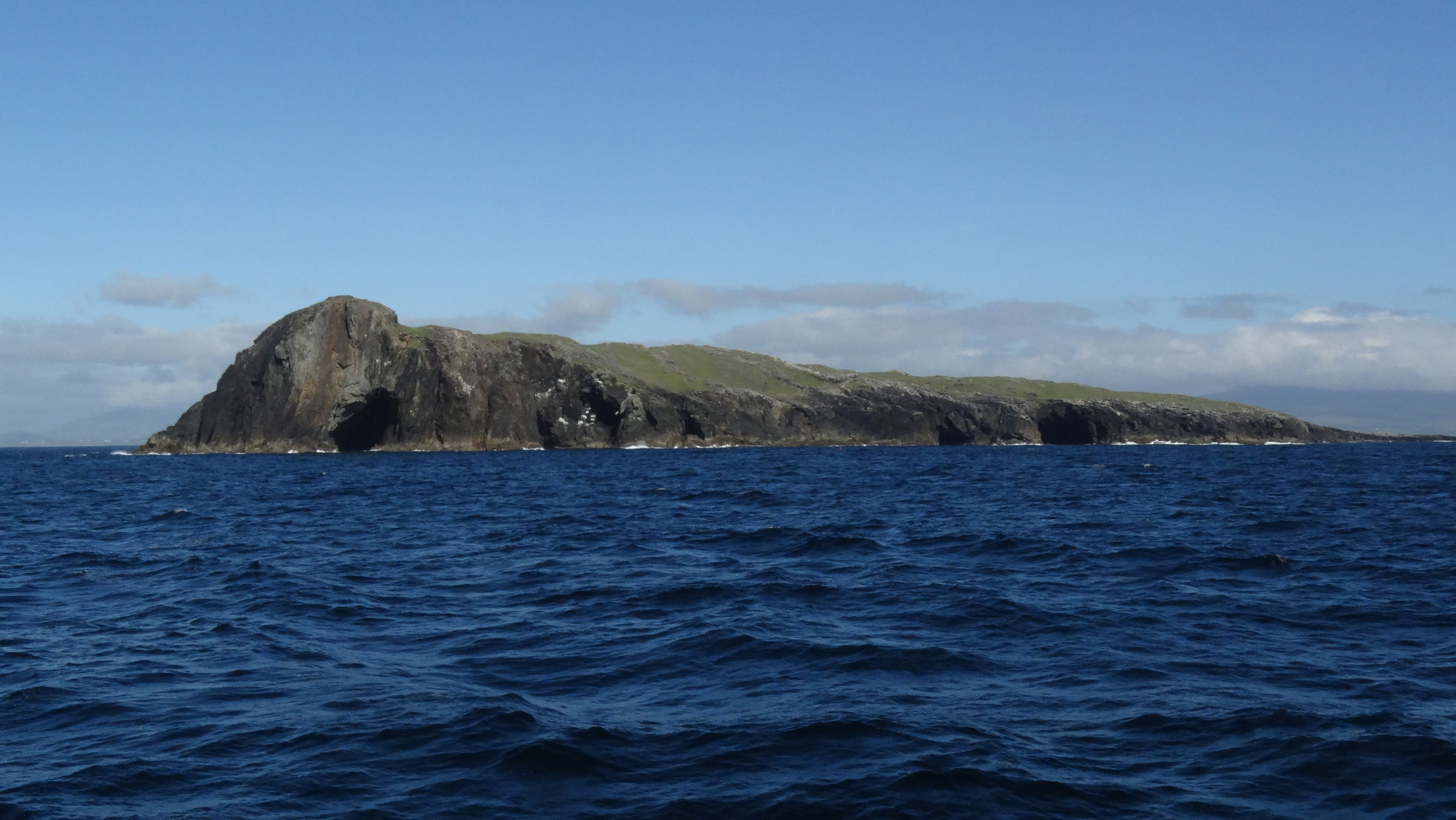
Approaching Caher Island

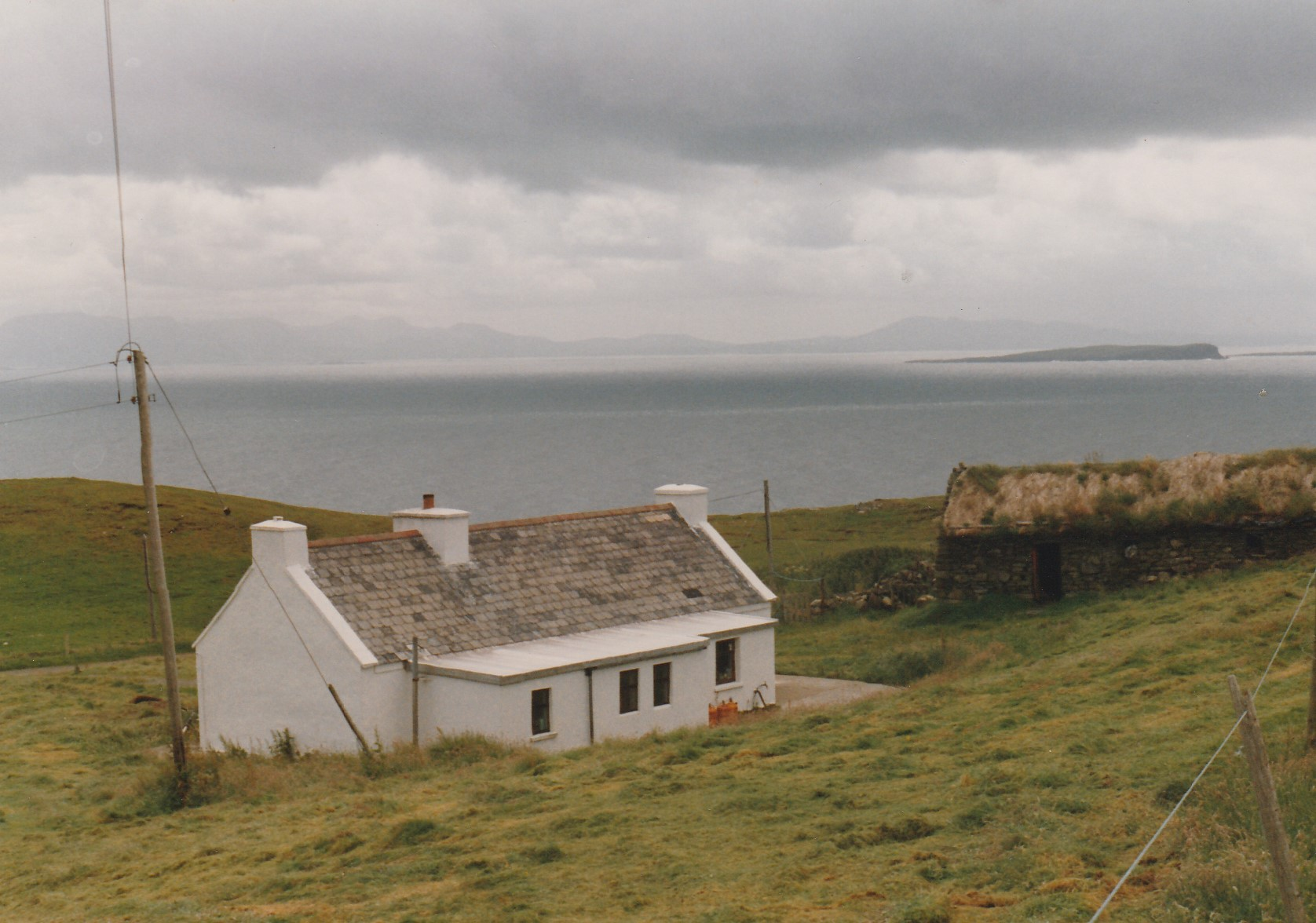
Caher Island in the distance, as viewed from Clare Island

== See also ==
- Clare Island
- Inishturk
