= Knockmore, Mayo =

Mountain on Clare Island, County Mayo, Ireland

Knockmore
- An Cnoc Mór
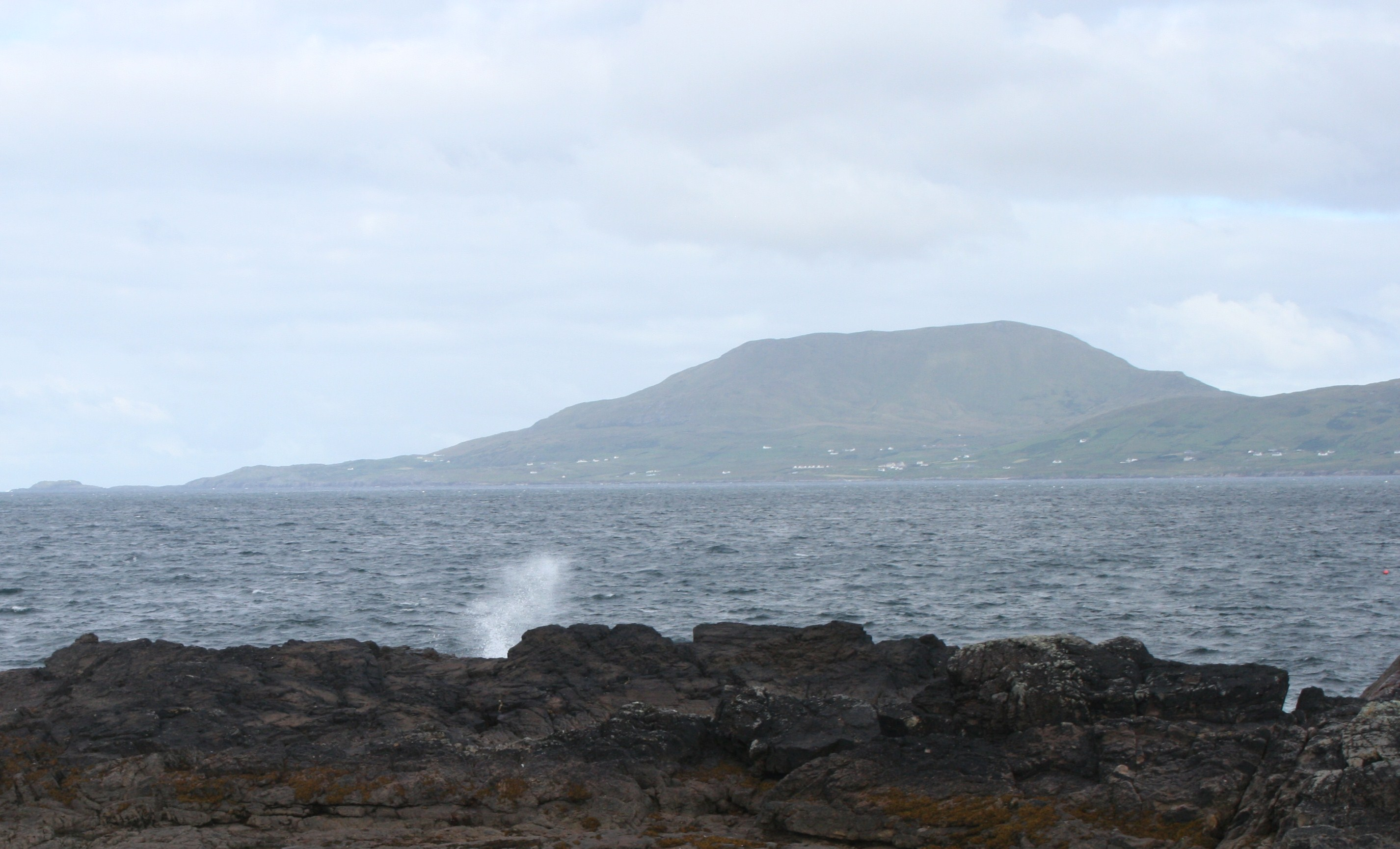
- Knockmore Mountain is clearly seen as the highest point on Clare

Highest point
- Elevation: 462 m (1,516 ft)
- Prominence: 462 m (1,516 ft)
- Listing: Marilyn
- Coordinates: 53°48′30″N 10°01′17″W

Geography
- Location within Ireland
- Location: Clare Island, Republic of Ireland
- Topo map: OSi Discovery 30

Knockmore (Irish: An Cnoc Mór, meaning 'The great hill') is a mountain on Clare Island off the coast of County Mayo, Ireland.

== Geography ==
The mountain is the highest peak on Clare Island at 462 metres (1,516 ft) and is the 572nd highest in Ireland.

== Access to the summit ==
It is a popular walking destination for island residents and tourists and is known for its view of Clew Bay and the west coast mainland as well as a view of the Atlantic Ocean.

== See also ==
- List of mountains in Ireland
- List of islands of Ireland
