= List of townlands of County Mayo =

Land divisions in County Mayo, Ireland

This is a sortable table of the approximately 3,424 townlands in County Mayo, Ireland. as was the case prior to 1873.

It DOES show townlands in the Civil Parish of Inishbofin which were transferred to Galway from Mayo in 1873 and townlands transferred to Roscommon in 1899, around and including Ballaghaderreen. It DOES NOT show townlands transferred from Galway in 1899 or townlands transferred from Sligo in 1899.

Duplicate names occur where there is more than one townland with the same name in the county. Names marked in bold typeface are towns, and the word Town appears for those entries in the Acres column.

== Townland list ==
Townland	Acres	Barony	Civil parish	Poor law union
Abbeylands	40	Tirawley	Killala	Killala
Abbeyquarter	193	Costello	Annagh	Claremorris
Abbeytown	124	Tirawley	Crossmolina	Ballina
Achillbeg Island	330	Burrishoole	Achill	Newport
Acres	89	Clanmorris	Mayo	Claremorris
Addergoole	942	Costello	Aghamore	Claremorris
Addergoole (or Knockmaria)	227	Tirawley	Addergoole	Castlebar
Aderg	129	Costello	Annagh	Claremorris
Aghadifflin	950	Costello	Kilmovee	Swineford
Aghadooey Glebe	44	Burrishoole	Burrishoole	Newport
Aghadoon	660	Erris	Kilmore	Belmullet
Aghadrinagh	355	Carra	Ballyhean	Castlebar
Aghafadda	71	Kilmaine	Ballinchalla	Ballinrobe
Aghaglasheen	1,522	Erris	Kilmore	Belmullet
**Aghagower**	Town	Burrishoole	Aghagower	Westport
Aghagower	445	Burrishoole	Aghagower	Westport
Aghagowla Beg	88	Burrishoole	Kilmaclasser	Westport
Aghagowla More	256	Burrishoole	Kilmaclasser	Westport
Aghalahard	153	Kilmaine	Cong	Ballinrobe
Aghaleague	574	Tirawley	Lackan	Killala
Aghaloonteen	591	Tirawley	Addergoole	Castlebar
Aghalusky	228	Carra	Aglish	Castlebar
Aghalusky	571	Gallen	Templemore	Castlebar
Aghamore	436	Costello	Aghamore	Swineford
Aghamore	44	Murrisk	Oughaval	Westport
Aghany	481	Murrisk	Kilgeever	Westport
Aghareville Lower	164	Clanmorris	Kilcolman	Claremorris
Aghareville Upper	233	Clanmorris	Kilcolman	Claremorris
Aghataharn	542	Costello	Aghamore	Swineford
Aghaward	251	Gallen	Toomore	Swineford
Aghinish	370	Carra	Ballyovey	Ballinrobe
Aghleam	732	Erris	Kilmore	Belmullet
Aghoo	508	Tirawley	Doonfeeny	Killala
Aghoos	897	Erris	Kilcommon	Belmullet
Aghtaboy	358	Costello	Knock	Claremorris
Agloragh	274	Costello	Annagh	Claremorris
Ahanroe	33	Carra	Breaghwy	Castlebar
Ahena	256	Clanmorris	Tagheen	Claremorris
Aille	656	Burrishoole	Aghagower	Westport
Aillebaun	1,244	Murrisk	Aghagower	Westport
Aillemore	714	Murrisk	Kilgeever	Westport
Allwoan Island	2	Tirawley	Ballysakeery	Ballina
Alt	291	Erris	Kilcommon	Belmullet
Altbaun	226	Gallen	Bohola	Swineford
Altderg	905	Tirawley	Kilfian	Killala
Altnabrocky	4,682	Erris	Kilcommon	Belmullet
Annagh	601	Costello	Aghamore	Swineford
Annagh	78	Kilmaine	Ballinrobe	Ballinrobe
Annagh	298	Carra	Islandeady	Castlebar
Annagh	421	Erris	Kilmore	Belmullet
Annagh Beg	478	Tirawley	Kilfian	Killala
Annagh Hill	154	Gallen	Killedan	Swineford
Annagh Island	52	Tirawley	Kilbelfad	Ballina
Annagh Island	627	Erris	Kilcommon	Newport
Annagh Island East	47	Murrisk	Oughaval	Westport
Annagh Island Middle	11	Murrisk	Oughaval	Westport
Annagh Island West	17	Murrisk	Oughaval	Westport
Annagh More	446	Tirawley	Kilfian	Killala
Annaghroe Island	22	Tirawley	Kilbelfad	Ballina
Annaghteige Island	14	Tirawley	Kilbelfad	Ballina
Annalecka	55	Carra	Aglish	Castlebar
Annies	179	Kilmaine	Robeen	Ballinrobe
Antigua (or Lisnageeha)	157	Carra	Aglish	Castlebar
Ara	495	Gallen	Kildacommoge	Castlebar
Ardacarha	301	Gallen	Bohola	Swineford
Ardagh	195	Tirawley	Ardagh	Ballina
Ardagh	64	Burrishoole	Burrishoole	Newport
Ardboley North	219	Clanmorris	Balla	Castlebar
Ardboley South	218	Clanmorris	Balla	Castlebar
Ardcloon	239	Gallen	Templemore	Castlebar
Ardcorky	251	Clanmorris	Mayo	Castlebar
Arderry	1,118	Burrishoole	Aghagower	Westport
Arderry	296	Costello	Aghamore	Swineford
Arderry	79	Costello	Annagh	Claremorris
Ardhoom	344	Gallen	Meelick	Swineford
Ardkeen	136	Burrishoole	Kilmeena	Westport
Ardkill	446	Costello	Castlemore	Castlereagh
Ardkill	431	Kilmaine	Kilcommon	Ballinrobe
Ardlee	87	Gallen	Kilconduff	Swineford
Ardmoran	129	Kilmaine	Kilmainebeg	Ballinrobe
Ardmore	143	Erris	Kilmore	Belmullet
Ardmore	57	Murrisk	Oughaval	Westport
Ardmore Point	93	Erris	Kilmore	Belmullet
Ardnacally	355	Kilmaine	Robeen	Ballinrobe
Ardnagor	137	Tirawley	Rathreagh	Killala
Ardogommon	233	Burrishoole	Aghagower	Westport
Ardoley	143	Murrisk	Oughaval	Westport
Ardoughan	268	Tirawley	Kilmoremoy	Ballina
Ardowen	173	Erris	Kilmore	Belmullet
Ardowen Common	21	Erris	Kilmore	Belmullet
Ardrass	235	Gallen	Attymass	Ballina
Ardroe	93	Clanmorris	Kilcolman	Claremorris
Ardvarney	377	Carra	Aglish	Castlebar
Ardvarney	42	Kilmaine	Kilmainebeg	Ballinrobe
Ardvarney	147	Tirawley	Moygawnagh	Killala
Ashbrook	142	Gallen	Templemore	Castlebar
Askillaun	874	Murrisk	Kilgeever	Westport
Askillaun	200	Gallen	Killasser	Swineford
Attavally	118	Carra	Ballintober	Castlebar
Attavally	816	Erris	Kilcommon	Belmullet
Attavally	107	Gallen	Killedan	Swineford
Attiantaggart	159	Costello	Kilcolman	Castlereagh
Attiappleton	140	Carra	Turlough	Castlebar
Atticahill	117	Gallen	Kildacommoge	Castlebar
Atticloghy	352	Tirawley	Rathreagh	Killala
Atticonaun	551	Erris	Kilcommon	Belmullet
Attimachugh	542	Gallen	Killasser	Swineford
Attinaskollia	89	Gallen	Killasser	Swineford
Attireesh	106	Murrisk	Oughaval	Westport
Attishane	206	Tirawley	Crossmolina	Ballina
Attishane (Joynt)	148	Tirawley	Crossmolina	Ballina
Aughernagalliagh	952	Erris	Kilmore	Belmullet
Aughness	2,709	Erris	Kilcommon	Newport
Bal of Dookinelly (Calvy)	189	Burrishoole	Achill	Newport
**Balla**	Town	Clanmorris	Balla	Castlebar
Balla	251	Clanmorris	Balla	Castlebar
**Ballaghaderreen**	Town	Costello	Kilcolman	Castlereagh
Ballaghaderreen	349	Costello	Kilcolman	Castlereagh
Ballaghamuck	565	Tirawley	Crossmolina	Ballina
Ballaghfarna	187	Carra	Drum	Castlebar
**Ballina**	Town	Tirawley	Kilmoremoy	Ballina
Ballina	601	Erris	Kilcommon	Belmullet
Ballina	137	Kilmaine	Kilmainemore	Ballinrobe
Ballina	602	Tirawley	Kilmoremoy	Ballina
Ballinacostello	132	Costello	Aghamore	Swineford
Ballinafad	306	Carra	Drum	Castlebar
Ballinagavna	109	Tirawley	Kilfian	Killala
Ballinagran	334	Clanmorris	Balla	Castlebar
Ballinalecka	87	Carra	Ballintober	Castlebar
Ballinamore	1,276	Gallen	Killedan	Swineford
Ballinaster	153	Clanmorris	Mayo	Claremorris
Ballinaya	233	Kilmaine	Ballinrobe	Ballinrobe
Ballinchalla	365	Kilmaine	Ballinchalla	Ballinrobe
Ballindell East	81	Clanmorris	Crossboyne	Claremorris
Ballindell West	49	Clanmorris	Crossboyne	Claremorris
**Ballindine**	Town	Clanmorris	Crossboyne	Claremorris
Ballindine East	127	Clanmorris	Crossboyne	Claremorris
Ballindine North	77	Clanmorris	Crossboyne	Claremorris
Ballindine West	90	Clanmorris	Crossboyne	Claremorris
Ballindoo (or Doocastle)	1,956	Costello	Kilturra	Swineford
Ballindrehid	405	Gallen	Kilconduff	Swineford
Ballingarden	78	Carra	Turlough	Castlebar
Ballinglen	1,451	Tirawley	Doonfeeny	Killala
Ballingrogy	111	Tirawley	Crossmolina	Ballina
Ballinhoe	178	Carra	Manulla	Castlebar
Ballinillaun	207	Gallen	Toomore	Swineford
Ballinlaban	427	Tirawley	Crossmolina	Ballina
Ballinlag	338	Gallen	Bohola	Swineford
Ballinlassa	163	Carra	Drum	Castlebar
Ballinlena	159	Tirawley	Kilcummin	Killala
Ballinlough	369	Burrishoole	Kilmeena	Westport
Ballinlough	500	Clanmorris	Mayo	Claremorris
Ballinloughaun	322	Tirawley	Crossmolina	Ballina
Ballinphuill	58	Costello	Bekan	Claremorris
Ballinphuill	123	Clanmorris	Kilcolman	Claremorris
**Ballinrobe**	Town	Kilmaine	Ballinrobe	Ballinrobe
Ballinrobe Demesne	286	Kilmaine	Ballinrobe	Ballinrobe
Ballinrumpa	181	Costello	Kilmovee	Swineford
Ballinsmaula	191	Clanmorris	Kilcolman	Claremorris
Ballintadder	122	Costello	Kilbeagh	Swineford
Ballintaffy	637	Clanmorris	Kilcolman	Claremorris
Ballintecan	359	Tirawley	Ballysakeery	Ballina
Ballinteeaun	321	Kilmaine	Ballinrobe	Ballinrobe
Ballintemple	314	Gallen	Meelick	Swineford
Ballintleva	423	Burrishoole	Kilmaclasser	Westport
Ballintleva	134	Clanmorris	Mayo	Castlebar
Ballintober	358	Carra	Ballintober	Castlebar
Ballintober	415	Tirawley	Kilfian	Killala
Ballinulty	254	Kilmaine	Kilmainemore	Ballinrobe
Ballinvilla	275	Carra	Aglish	Castlebar
Ballinvilla	436	Clanmorris	Kilvine	Claremorris
Ballinvilla Demesne	76	Costello	Bekan	Claremorris
Ballinvoash	180	Carra	Turlough	Castlebar
Ballinvoher	98	Gallen	Meelick	Swineford
Ballinvoy	117	Burrishoole	Aghagower	Westport
Ballisnahyny	315	Kilmaine	Kilmainebeg	Ballinrobe
Ballisnahyny	839	Kilmaine	Shrule	Ballinrobe
Balloor	168	Costello	Aghamore	Swineford
Balloor	151	Carra	Breaghwy	Castlebar
Balloor	179	Murrisk	Kilgeever	Westport
Balloor East	145	Carra	Ballintober	Castlebar
Balloor West	80	Carra	Ballintober	Castlebar
Balloorclerhy	475	Gallen	Killedan	Swineford
Balloughadalla	635	Tirawley	Ballysakeery	Ballina
Ballyargadaun	205	Kilmaine	Ballinchalla	Ballinrobe
Ballyargadaun	161	Kilmaine	Kilmolara	Ballinrobe
Ballyart	70	Carra	Turlough	Castlebar
Ballybackagh	83	Kilmaine	Kilmainebeg	Ballinrobe
Ballyballinaun	192	Burrishoole	Aghagower	Westport
Ballybanaun Mountain	472	Carra	Ballyovey	Ballinrobe
Ballybaun	314	Costello	Annagh	Claremorris
Ballybeg	119	Costello	Annagh	Claremorris
Ballybeg	388	Tirawley	Ballynahaglish	Ballina
Ballybeg	102	Erris	Kilcommon	Belmullet
Ballybeg	716	Tirawley	Rathreagh	Killala
Ballybeg Island	6	Murrisk	Kilgeever	Westport
Ballybrinoge	192	Tirawley	Crossmolina	Ballina
Ballybroony	842	Tirawley	Ballysakeery	Ballina
Ballycally	784	Carra	Burriscarra	Ballinrobe
Ballycarra	184	Carra	Drum	Castlebar
Ballycarroon	203	Tirawley	Crossmolina	Ballina
**Ballycastle**	Town	Tirawley	Doonfeeny	Killala
Ballycastle	298	Tirawley	Doonfeeny	Killala
Ballyclogher	824	Clanmorris	Balla	Castlebar
Ballycong	582	Gallen	Attymass	Ballina
Ballycurrin Demesne	557	Kilmaine	Shrule	Ballinrobe
Ballycusheen	765	Kilmaine	Kilmainemore	Ballinrobe
Ballydavock	78	Carra	Drum	Castlebar
Ballyderg	395	Tirawley	Ballynahaglish	Ballina
Ballydonnellan	59	Burrishoole	Aghagower	Westport
Ballydrum	346	Gallen	Kilconduff	Swineford
Ballyduffy	167	Tirawley	Addergoole	Castlebar
Ballyfarnagh	358	Clanmorris	Kilcolman	Claremorris
Ballygarries	183	Kilmaine	Robeen	Ballinrobe
Ballygarriff	217	Carra	Turlough	Castlebar
Ballygarry	128	Carra	Ballyovey	Ballinrobe
Ballygarry	120	Tirawley	Kilcummin	Killala
Ballyglass	72	Costello	Aghamore	Swineford
Ballyglass	244	Kilmaine	Ballinchalla	Ballinrobe
Ballyglass	894	Clanmorris	Crossboyne	Claremorris
Ballyglass	357	Tirawley	Doonfeeny	Killala
Ballyglass	270	Clanmorris	Kilcolman	Claremorris
Ballyglass	154	Gallen	Kilconduff	Swineford
Ballyglass	306	Burrishoole	Kilmaclasser	Westport
Ballyglass	243	Erris	Kilmore	Belmullet
Ballyglass	307	Costello	Kilmovee	Swineford
Ballyglass	125	Tirawley	Moygawnagh	Killala
Ballyglass	171	Carra	Touaghty	Ballinrobe
Ballyglass East	213	Costello	Kilbeagh	Swineford
Ballyglass Lower	211	Costello	Annagh	Claremorris
Ballyglass Middle	316	Costello	Annagh	Claremorris
Ballyglass West	74	Costello	Kilbeagh	Swineford
Ballygolman	337	Murrisk	Aghagower	Westport
Ballygomman	238	Carra	Kildacommoge	Castlebar
Ballygowan	88	Clanmorris	Kilcolman	Claremorris
Ballygowan	308	Tirawley	Rathreagh	Killala
Ballyguin	114	Carra	Turlough	Castlebar
Ballyhankeen	373	Clanmorris	Crossboyne	Claremorris
Ballyhanruck	309	Tirawley	Kilbelfad	Ballina
**Ballyhaunis**	Town	Costello	Annagh	Claremorris
**Ballyhaunis**	Town	Costello	Bekan	Claremorris
Ballyheer	498	Murrisk	Kilgeever	Westport
Ballyheeragh (Caslane)	302	Kilmaine	Kilcommon	Ballinrobe
Ballyheeragh (St. Leger)	303	Kilmaine	Kilcommon	Ballinrobe
Ballyhenry	38	Kilmaine	Kilmainemore	Ballinrobe
Ballyhenry (or Caraun)	168	Kilmaine	Kilmainebeg	Ballinrobe
Ballyhiernaun	274	Tirawley	Ballynahaglish	Ballina
Ballyhine	206	Costello	Aghamore	Swineford
Ballyhowly	242	Clanmorris	Knock	Claremorris
Ballyjennings	218	Kilmaine	Kilmainemore	Ballinrobe
Ballykerrigan	56	Clanmorris	Balla	Castlebar
Ballykill Lower	132	Carra	Breaghwy	Castlebar
Ballykill Upper	81	Carra	Breaghwy	Castlebar
Ballykilleen	649	Costello	Annagh	Claremorris
Ballykinava	1,001	Clanmorris	Kilcolman	Claremorris
Ballykine Lower	455	Kilmaine	Cong	Oughterard
Ballykine Upper	159	Kilmaine	Cong	Ballinrobe
Ballykinlettragh	1,864	Tirawley	Kilfian	Killala
Ballyknock	825	Tirawley	Addergoole	Castlebar
Ballyknock	709	Tirawley	Doonfeeny	Killala
Ballylahan	283	Gallen	Templemore	Castlebar
Ballymacgibbon N.	236	Kilmaine	Cong	Ballinrobe
Ballymacgibbon S.	375	Kilmaine	Cong	Ballinrobe
Ballymachugh	357	Tirawley	Kilbride	Killala
Ballymackeehola	1,334	Tirawley	Ballysakeery	Ballina
Ballymackeogh	230	Clanmorris	Balla	Castlebar
Ballymacloughlin	113	Clanmorris	Balla	Castlebar
Ballymacrah	367	Carra	Aglish	Castlebar
Ballymacredmond	146	Tirawley	Addergoole	Castlebar
Ballymacredmond	335	Tirawley	Ballynahaglish	Ballina
Ballymacsherron	335	Erris	Kilmore	Belmullet
Ballymaging (or Castlemore)	285	Costello	Castlemore	Castlereagh
Ballymanagh	187	Tirawley	Ardagh	Ballina
Ballymangan	282	Kilmaine	Kilcommon	Ballinrobe
Ballymartin	327	Kilmaine	Kilmainemore	Ballinrobe
Ballymiles	141	Gallen	Meelick	Swineford
Ballymoneen	157	Tirawley	Crossmolina	Ballina
Ballymore	599	Gallen	Attymass	Ballina
Ballymoyock	320	Tirawley	Addergoole	Castlebar
Ballymullavil	106	Clanmorris	Mayo	Claremorris
Ballymurphy	77	Tirawley	Lackan	Killala
Ballynaboll	277	Tirawley	Ballysakeery	Ballina
Ballynaboll North	64	Carra	Aglish	Castlebar
Ballynaboll South	121	Carra	Aglish	Castlebar
Ballynabrehon North	296	Clanmorris	Kilcolman	Claremorris
Ballynabrehon South	317	Clanmorris	Kilcolman	Claremorris
Ballynacarragh	172	Kilmaine	Kilmainemore	Ballinrobe
Ballynacarrick	284	Clanmorris	Kilcolman	Claremorris
Ballynacarriga	191	Carra	Aglish	Castlebar
Ballynacarriga	306	Burrishoole	Kilmaclasser	Westport
Ballynacloy	218	Costello	Aghamore	Swineford
Ballynacloy	272	Tirawley	Crossmolina	Ballina
Ballynagarha	189	Carra	Ballyhean	Castlebar
Ballynaglea	177	Carra	Touaghty	Ballinrobe
Ballynagor	419	Tirawley	Moygawnagh	Killala
Ballynahaglish	189	Tirawley	Ballynahaglish	Ballina
Ballynakillew	121	Kilmaine	Ballinrobe	Ballinrobe
Ballynaleck	217	Tirawley	Lackan	Killala
Ballynalty	632	Kilmaine	Shrule	Ballinrobe
Ballynalynagh	273	Tirawley	Crossmolina	Ballina
Ballynamarroge	406	Burrishoole	Islandeady	Westport
Ballynamona	583	Gallen	Killedan	Swineford
Ballynamuddagh	162	Carra	Rosslee	Ballinrobe
Ballynanerroon Beg	77	Carra	Ballyovey	Ballinrobe
Ballynanerroon More	255	Carra	Ballyovey	Ballinrobe
Ballynaraha	91	Tirawley	Ballynahaglish	Ballina
Ballynaslee	101	Carra	Ballyovey	Ballinrobe
Ballynastangford Lower	143	Clanmorris	Kilcolman	Claremorris
Ballynastangford Upper	99	Clanmorris	Kilcolman	Claremorris
Ballynastocka	268	Costello	Annagh	Claremorris
Ballyneety	310	Tirawley	Crossmolina	Ballina
Ballyneggin	180	Carra	Aglish	Castlebar
Ballynew	98	Carra	Aglish	Castlebar
Ballynew	119	Clanmorris	Kilcolman	Claremorris
Ballynew	174	Clanmorris	Tagheen	Claremorris
Ballyoughter	317	Costello	Kilcolman	Castlereagh
Ballyroe	91	Costello	Knock	Claremorris
Ballyrourke	145	Clanmorris	Balla	Castlebar
Ballyrourke	49	Kilmaine	Ballinchalla	Ballinrobe
Ballysakeery	436	Tirawley	Ballysakeery	Ballina
Ballyscanlan	253	Tirawley	Crossmolina	Ballina
Ballyshane	233	Carra	Breaghwy	Castlebar
Ballyshingadaun	286	Kilmaine	Kilmolara	Ballinrobe
Ballyteige	472	Tirawley	Addergoole	Castlebar
Ballytoohy Beg	121	Murrisk	Kilgeever	Westport
Ballytoohy More	526	Murrisk	Kilgeever	Westport
Ballytrasna	239	Kilmaine	Kilmolara	Ballinrobe
Ballyvicmaha	249	Tirawley	Crossmolina	Ballina
Ballywalter	220	Kilmaine	Kilmolara	Ballinrobe
Ballywalter	181	Kilmaine	Robeen	Ballinrobe
Ballyweela	380	Kilmaine	Kilcommon	Ballinrobe
Banagher	130	Tirawley	Kilcummin	Killala
Bangor	762	Erris	Kilcommon	Belmullet
Baralty	1,190	Erris	Kilcommon	Belmullet
Barcull	702	Costello	Kilmovee	Swineford
Bargarriff	458	Costello	Annagh	Claremorris
Barheen	126	Costello	Annagh	Claremorris
Barleyhill	638	Gallen	Bohola	Swineford
Barna	193	Kilmaine	Ballinchalla	Ballinrobe
Barnabaun	66	Murrisk	Kilgeever	Westport
Barnaboy	353	Costello	Castlemore	Castlereagh
Barnacahoge	1,316	Costello	Kilbeagh	Swineford
Barnacuillew	243	Erris	Kilcommon	Belmullet
Barnaderg	1,131	Murrisk	Oughaval	Westport
Barnagreggaun	480	Clanmorris	Mayo	Claremorris
Barnagurry	572	Costello	Aghamore	Swineford
Barnahesker	217	Costello	Aghamore	Swineford
Barnakillew	134	Carra	Ballintober	Castlebar
Barnalyra	796	Costello	Kilbeagh	Swineford
Barnastang	300	Carra	Islandeady	Westport
Barney	193	Carra	Breaghwy	Castlebar
Barnhill Lower	139	Tirawley	Lackan	Killala
Barnhill Upper	373	Tirawley	Lackan	Killala
Barnycarroll	253	Clanmorris	Kilcolman	Claremorris
Barrack North	12	Erris	Kilmore	Belmullet
Barrack South	174	Erris	Kilmore	Belmullet
Barrackhill	106	Burrishoole	Burrishoole	Newport
Barrackland	144	Carra	Manulla	Castlebar
Barraglanna	1,267	Murrisk	Oughaval	Westport
Barranagh East	266	Erris	Kilmore	Belmullet
Barranagh Island	63	Erris	Kilmore	Belmullet
Barranagh West	95	Erris	Kilmore	Belmullet
Barranarran Lower	63	Tirawley	Kilfian	Killala
Barranarran Upper	168	Tirawley	Kilfian	Killala
Barreel	238	Clanmorris	Tagheen	Claremorris
Barrettsplot East	118	Erris	Kilmore	Belmullet
Barrettsplot West	54	Erris	Kilmore	Belmullet
Barroe	774	Costello	Kilbeagh	Swineford
Barroe	135	Tirawley	Lackan	Killala
Barroosky	1,951	Erris	Kilcommon	Belmullet
Bartragh Island	316	Tirawley	Killala	Killala
Bartrauve	600	Erris	Kilmore	Belmullet
Baunoges	245	Carra	Ballintober	Castlebar
Baunrosmore	9	Tirawley	Killala	Killala
Bawn	109	Kilmaine	Ballinrobe	Ballinrobe
Beetle Island North	2	Burrishoole	Burrishoole	Newport
Beetle Island South	1	Burrishoole	Burrishoole	Newport
Behy	292	Tirawley	Crossmolina	Ballina
Behy	2,561	Tirawley	Doonfeeny	Killala
Behybaun	103	Tirawley	Ballynahaglish	Ballina
Bekan	632	Costello	Bekan	Claremorris
Belclare	131	Murrisk	Oughaval	Westport
Belderg Beg	757	Tirawley	Doonfeeny	Killala
Belderg More	2,750	Tirawley	Doonfeeny	Killala
Belesker	153	Costello	Bekan	Claremorris
Belfarsad	695	Burrishoole	Achill	Newport
Belgarrow	578	Gallen	Toomore	Swineford
Bellaburke	500	Carra	Ballintober	Castlebar
Bellacorick	800	Erris	Kilcommon	Belmullet
Belladaff	138	Clanmorris	Tagheen	Claremorris
Belladooan	433	Tirawley	Kilfian	Killala
Bellagarvaun	1,543	Erris	Kilcommon	Newport
Bellagelly North	2,528	Erris	Kilcommon	Belmullet
Bellagelly South	3,409	Erris	Kilcommon	Belmullet
Bellakip	1,015	Murrisk	Kilgeever	Westport
Bellanaboy	1,050	Erris	Kilcommon	Belmullet
Bellanabriscaun	58	Kilmaine	Kilmainebeg	Ballinrobe
Bellanacurra	93	Gallen	Killasser	Swineford
Bellanaloob	499	Kilmaine	Robeen	Ballinrobe
Bellanasally	833	Burrishoole	Achill	Newport
Bellanierin	183	Carra	Turlough	Castlebar
Bellanumera	119	Erris	Kilcommon	Belmullet
Bellasallagh	155	Tirawley	Rathreagh	Killala
Bellass	370	Tirawley	Ballynahaglish	Ballina
Bellataleen	438	Murrisk	Oughaval	Westport
Bellavanum	181	Murrisk	Kilgeever	Westport
**Bellavary**	Town	Gallen	Kildacommoge	Castlebar
Bellavary	660	Gallen	Kildacommoge	Castlebar
Bellaveel	66	Costello	Annagh	Claremorris
Bellaveeny	3,649	Erris	Kilcommon	Newport
Belleek	210	Tirawley	Kilmoremoy	Ballina
Bellfield	73	Clanmorris	Kilcolman	Claremorris
**Belmullet**	Town	Erris	Kilcommon	Belmullet
Belmullet	319	Erris	Kilcommon	Belmullet
Beltra	1,989	Carra	Islandeady	Castlebar
Beltra	215	Tirawley	Kilcummin	Killala
Beltra	22	Tirawley	Lackan	Killala
Bengeery	221	Tirawley	Crossmolina	Ballina
Billoos	370	Tirawley	Lackan	Killala
**Binghamstown**	Town	Erris	Kilmore	Belmullet
Binghamstown	715	Erris	Kilmore	Belmullet
Birchfield	112	Clanmorris	Kilcolman	Claremorris
Bird Island	1	Carra	Ballintober	Castlebar
Black Island	1	Kilmaine	Ballinchalla	Ballinrobe
Black Rock	3	Murrisk	Inishbofin	Clifden
Black Rock	3	Erris	Kilmore	Belmullet
Blackpatch	154	Gallen	Killasser	Swineford
Bleachyard	87	Burrishoole	Burrishoole	Newport
Bleanmore Island	34	Erris	Kilcommon	Newport
Blessingtown	81	Kilmaine	Kilmainemore	Ballinrobe
Bloomfield	821	Kilmaine	Robeen	Ballinrobe
Bockagh	448	Costello	Kilcolman	Castlereagh
Bocullin	118	Burrishoole	Kilmeena	Westport
Bofara	132	Murrisk	Aghagower	Westport
Bofeenaun	659	Tirawley	Addergoole	Castlebar
Boggy	678	Tirawley	Addergoole	Castlebar
Boghadoon	1,197	Tirawley	Addergoole	Castlebar
Boghtaduff	931	Costello	Castlemore	Castlereagh
Bohalas	494	Costello	Castlemore	Castlereagh
Bohamore	328	Gallen	Bohola	Swineford
Bohaun	226	Costello	Knock	Claremorris
Bohaun North	845	Carra	Ballintober	Ballinrobe
Bohaun South	728	Carra	Ballintober	Ballinrobe
Boheh	424	Murrisk	Aghagower	Westport
Boheh	360	Murrisk	Oughaval	Westport
Bohehs	109	Carra	Islandeady	Westport
Boherduff	51	Clanmorris	Kilcolman	Claremorris
Boherhallagh	641	Gallen	Toomore	Swineford
Bohoge	243	Carra	Manulla	Castlebar
Bohogerawer	161	Costello	Bekan	Claremorris
Bohola	565	Gallen	Bohola	Swineford
Boleyard	425	Gallen	Kildacommoge	Castlebar
Boleybeg	432	Clanmorris	Tagheen	Claremorris
Boleyboy	136	Costello	Aghamore	Swineford
Boleyboy	64	Gallen	Killasser	Swineford
Boleyboy	549	Clanmorris	Kilvine	Claremorris
Boleybrian	176	Murrisk	Aghagower	Westport
Boleyglass	384	Tirawley	Addergoole	Castlebar
Boleymeelagh	186	Kilmaine	Kilcommon	Ballinrobe
Boleysillagh	516	Costello	Kilcolman	Castlereagh
Bolinglanna	2,930	Burrishoole	Achill	Newport
Bolinree	116	Clanmorris	Kilcolman	Claremorris
Bonniamillish Island	3	Carra	Ballyovey	Ballinrobe
Bothaul	332	Gallen	Meelick	Swineford
Botinny	527	Costello	Kilbeagh	Swineford
Boyd's Islands	3	Carra	Aglish	Castlebar
Boyhollagh	1,085	Gallen	Attymass	Ballina
Boyogonnell	112	Carra	Turlough	Castlebar
Bracklagh	1,773	Tirawley	Addergoole	Castlebar
Bracklagh	140	Murrisk	Aghagower	Westport
Bracklagh	487	Costello	Bekan	Claremorris
Bracklagh	190	Costello	Kilbeagh	Swineford
Bracklaghboy	263	Costello	Bekan	Claremorris
Brackloon	334	Murrisk	Aghagower	Westport
Brackloon	567	Gallen	Kilconduff	Swineford
Brackloon	128	Kilmaine	Kilmainemore	Ballinrobe
Brackloon	146	Kilmaine	Shrule	Ballinrobe
Brackloon East	127	Costello	Bekan	Claremorris
Brackloon North	488	Costello	Bekan	Claremorris
Brackloon South	307	Costello	Bekan	Claremorris
Brackloon West	495	Costello	Bekan	Claremorris
Brackloonagh	69	Tirawley	Ardagh	Ballina
Brackloonagh North	187	Costello	Kilbeagh	Swineford
Brackloonagh South	207	Costello	Kilbeagh	Swineford
Brackwanshagh	355	Tirawley	Kilbelfad	Ballina
Branraduff	229	Clanmorris	Crossboyne	Claremorris
Breaghwy	52	Carra	Breaghwy	Castlebar
Breaghwyanteean	411	Tirawley	Kilfian	Killala
Breaghwyanurlaur	331	Tirawley	Kilfian	Killala
Breandrum	62	Gallen	Kildacommoge	Castlebar
Breandrum (or Windsor)	215	Carra	Breaghwy	Castlebar
Breastagh	271	Tirawley	Templemurry	Killala
Brees	242	Clanmorris	Mayo	Castlebar
Brickeens	368	Costello	Bekan	Claremorris
Briska	3,636	Erris	Kilcommon	Belmullet
Brittas	149	Kilmaine	Kilcommon	Ballinrobe
Broadlands (or Knockafarson)	230	Tirawley	Ballysakeery	Ballina
Brockagh	183	Burrishoole	Kilmaclasser	Westport
Brodullagh North	249	Kilmaine	Shrule	Ballinrobe
Brodullagh South	502	Kilmaine	Shrule	Ballinrobe
Brogher	245	Costello	Kilcolman	Castlereagh
Brookhill	101	Clanmorris	Crossboyne	Claremorris
Brownespark	19	Gallen	Killedan	Swineford
Brownhall Demesne	604	Clanmorris	Mayo	Castlebar
Brownsisland	547	Kilmaine	Kilmainemore	Ballinrobe
Brownstown (or Donnageaga)	343	Kilmaine	Robeen	Ballinrobe
Bruff	131	Costello	Aghamore	Swineford
Buckfield	238	Burrishoole	Kilmeena	Westport
Buckwaria	119	Murrisk	Aghagower	Westport
Bulcaun	173	Costello	Kilbeagh	Swineford
Bullaun	54	Kilmaine	Moorgagagh	Ballinrobe
Bullaunmeneen	273	Burrishoole	Aghagower	Westport
Bunacrower	151	Kilmaine	Kilmainemore	Ballinrobe
Bunacurry	1,226	Burrishoole	Achill	Newport
Bunalty	954	Erris	Kilcommon	Belmullet
Bunaneraghtish	337	Tirawley	Ardagh	Ballina
Bunanioo	1,809	Burrishoole	Achill	Newport
Bunavaunish	186	Kilmaine	Ballinchalla	Ballinrobe
Bunaveela	1,112	Tirawley	Crossmolina	Ballina
Bunawillin	271	Erris	Kilcommon	Belmullet
Buncam East	103	Carra	Ballyhean	Castlebar
Buncam North	64	Carra	Ballyhean	Castlebar
Buncam West	109	Carra	Ballyhean	Castlebar
Bundeeleen	231	Tirawley	Crossmolina	Ballina
**Bundorragha**	Town	Murrisk	Kilgeever	Westport
Bundorragha	767	Murrisk	Kilgeever	Westport
Bunduff	180	Costello	Annagh	Claremorris
Bunduvowen	554	Carra	Turlough	Castlebar
Bunmore East	1,899	Erris	Kilcommon	Newport
Bunmore West	2,215	Erris	Kilcommon	Newport
Bunnadober	160	Kilmaine	Ballinchalla	Ballinrobe
Bunnadober	231	Costello	Bekan	Claremorris
Bunnafinglas	316	Gallen	Attymass	Ballina
Bunnafollistran	936	Kilmaine	Shrule	Ballinrobe
Bunnahowen	448	Erris	Kilcommon	Belmullet
Bunnahowna	859	Burrishoole	Burrishoole	Newport
Bunnamohaun	889	Murrisk	Kilgeever	Westport
Bunnyconnellan East	2,212	Gallen	Kilgarvan	Ballina
Bunnyconnellan West	507	Gallen	Kilgarvan	Ballina
Bunowen	171	Murrisk	Kilgeever	Westport
Bunrawer	271	Burrishoole	Aghagower	Westport
Burnafaunia	73	Carra	Drum	Castlebar
Burnt Island	7	Tirawley	Kilbelfad	Ballina
Burren	1,875	Carra	Aglish	Castlebar
Burren	188	Carra	Touaghty	Ballinrobe
Burris	29	Clanmorris	Crossboyne	Claremorris
Burris	345	Clanmorris	Kilvine	Claremorris
Burris	224	Carra	Manulla	Castlebar
Burriscarra	259	Carra	Burriscarra	Ballinrobe
Bush Island	1	Tirawley	Addergoole	Castlebar
Bush Island	1	Kilmaine	Robeen	Ballinrobe
Bushfield	193	Kilmaine	Kilcommon	Ballinrobe
Cabintown	193	Tirawley	Kilbride	Killala
Cabragh	255	Tirawley	Crossmolina	Ballina
Cabragh	168	Gallen	Toomore	Swineford
Caffoley	394	Tirawley	Addergoole	Ballina
Caher	564	Costello	Aghamore	Swineford
Caher	121	Kilmaine	Ballinrobe	Ballinrobe
Caher	181	Kilmaine	Kilcommon	Ballinrobe
Caher	417	Murrisk	Kilgeever	Westport
Caher	81	Kilmaine	Kilmainemore	Ballinrobe
Caher Island	128	Murrisk	Kilgeever	Westport
Caheravoostia	351	Kilmaine	Kilcommon	Ballinrobe
Cahercroobeen	64	Kilmaine	Ballinrobe	Ballinrobe
Caherduff	376	Kilmaine	Cong	Ballinrobe
Caheredmond	156	Kilmaine	Ballinrobe	Ballinrobe
Cahergal	75	Burrishoole	Burrishoole	Newport
Caherhemush	134	Kilmaine	Kilmolara	Ballinrobe
Caherloughlin	252	Kilmaine	Ballinchalla	Ballinrobe
Cahermaculick	459	Kilmaine	Moorgagagh	Ballinrobe
Cahernablauhy	151	Kilmaine	Ballinrobe	Ballinrobe
Cahernabrock	612	Kilmaine	Shrule	Ballinrobe
Cahernabudogy	67	Kilmaine	Ballinrobe	Ballinrobe
Cahernacreevy	87	Kilmaine	Ballinrobe	Ballinrobe
Cahernagollum	180	Kilmaine	Ballinchalla	Ballinrobe
Cahernagry East	76	Kilmaine	Kilmolara	Ballinrobe
Cahernagry West	199	Kilmaine	Kilmolara	Ballinrobe
Cahernamallaght	249	Kilmaine	Ballinrobe	Ballinrobe
Cahernamart	162	Murrisk	Oughaval	Westport
Cahernaran Island	4	Murrisk	Oughaval	Westport
Cahernichole East	133	Kilmaine	Ballinchalla	Ballinrobe
Cahernichole West	73	Kilmaine	Ballinchalla	Ballinrobe
Caherrevagh and Cloonameeltoge	623	Kilmaine	Kilmainemore	Ballinrobe
Caherrobert	191	Kilmaine	Ballinchalla	Ballinrobe
Caherwiclaun	326	Kilmaine	Kilmainemore	Ballinrobe
Caldragh	170	Costello	Knock	Claremorris
Calf Island	8	Burrishoole	Kilmeena	Westport
Calla	28	Murrisk	Kilgeever	Westport
Callacoon	529	Murrisk	Kilgeever	Westport
Calliaghadoo	449	Tirawley	Moygawnagh	Killala
Callow	1,242	Gallen	Killasser	Swineford
Callowbrack	624	Burrishoole	Burrishoole	Newport
Caltragh	109	Clanmorris	Crossboyne	Claremorris
Calveagh Lower	221	Costello	Kilbeagh	Castlereagh
Calveagh Upper	162	Costello	Kilbeagh	Castlereagh
Camcloon Beg	135	Burrishoole	Burrishoole	Newport
Camcloon More	83	Burrishoole	Burrishoole	Newport
Camderrynabinnia	222	Gallen	Killedan	Swineford
Camillaun	1	Kilmaine	Cong	Ballinrobe
Camillaun (or Holy Island)	4	Kilmaine	Cong	Ballinrobe
Canbrack	264	Gallen	Killedan	Swineford
Capnagower	214	Murrisk	Kilgeever	Westport
Cappacharnaun	292	Carra	Ballintober	Castlebar
Cappacurry	315	Kilmaine	Ballinrobe	Ballinrobe
Cappagh	315	Costello	Aghamore	Swineford
Cappagh	284	Carra	Aglish	Castlebar
Cappagh North	116	Clanmorris	Tagheen	Claremorris
Cappagh South	124	Clanmorris	Tagheen	Claremorris
Cappaghduff East	458	Carra	Ballyovey	Ballinrobe
Cappaghduff West	514	Carra	Ballyovey	Ballinrobe
Cappanaglogh	119	Tirawley	Kilbelfad	Ballina
Capparanny	248	Carra	Turlough	Castlebar
Cappavicar North	171	Carra	Turlough	Castlebar
Cappavicar South	174	Carra	Turlough	Castlebar
Cappulcorragh	545	Costello	Kilbeagh	Swineford
Caraun	359	Clanmorris	Kilcolman	Claremorris
Caraun (or Ballyhenry)	168	Kilmaine	Kilmainebeg	Ballinrobe
Carbad Beg	72	Tirawley	Templemurry	Killala
Carbad More	321	Tirawley	Templemurry	Killala
Carha	508	Carra	Islandeady	Westport
Carha	835	Gallen	Kilgarvan	Ballina
Carheen	186	Carra	Ballyovey	Ballinrobe
Carheenbrack	635	Burrishoole	Burrishoole	Newport
Carheens	108	Carra	Breaghwy	Castlebar
Carheens	252	Kilmaine	Cong	Ballinrobe
Carn	212	Kilmaine	Ballinchalla	Ballinrobe
Carn	94	Kilmaine	Ballinrobe	Ballinrobe
Carn	505	Carra	Ballintober	Castlebar
Carn	128	Carra	Breaghwy	Castlebar
Carn	158	Costello	Kilbeagh	Swineford
Carn	367	Gallen	Kilconduff	Swineford
Carn	620	Tirawley	Lackan	Killala
Carn	239	Tirawley	Moygawnagh	Killala
Carn (Fowler)	675	Erris	Kilmore	Belmullet
Carn (Nash)	640	Erris	Kilmore	Belmullet
Carn Beg	164	Costello	Aghamore	Swineford
Carn More	196	Costello	Aghamore	Swineford
Carnclogh	330	Tirawley	Moygawnagh	Killala
Carnhill	597	Erris	Kilcommon	Belmullet
Carrick	196	Gallen	Attymass	Ballina
Carrick	421	Gallen	Killedan	Swineford
Carrick Hill	107	Carra	Breaghwy	Castlebar
Carrickacat	196	Costello	Annagh	Claremorris
Carrickanass	216	Tirawley	Lackan	Killala
Carrickaneady	247	Burrishoole	Burrishoole	Newport
Carrickavea	1	Murrisk	Kilgeever	Westport
Carrickbarrett	206	Tirawley	Addergoole	Castlebar
Carrickboorla	1	Murrisk	Kilgeever	Westport
Carrickheelia	1	Murrisk	Inishbofin	Clifden
Carrickkildavnet	184	Burrishoole	Achill	Newport
Carrickmacantire	232	Costello	Annagh	Claremorris
Carrickmacantire	232	Costello	Annagh	Claremorris
Carrigeen Middle	1	Kilmaine	Ballinchalla	Ballinrobe
Carrigeenagur	1	Kilmaine	Ballinchalla	Ballinrobe
Carrigeendavoe	3	Kilmaine	Ballinchalla	Ballinrobe
Carrigeenglass North	3	Burrishoole	Kilmeena	Westport
Carrigeenglass South	1	Burrishoole	Kilmeena	Westport
Carrigeennakeelagh	12	Kilmaine	Cong	Ballinrobe
Carrigskeewaun	142	Murrisk	Kilgeever	Westport
Carrow Beg	144	Costello	Annagh	Claremorris
Carrow More	166	Costello	Annagh	Claremorris
Carrowaneeragh	191	Carra	Ballyovey	Ballinrobe
Carroward	448	Gallen	Bohola	Swineford
Carrowbaun	231	Costello	Aghamore	Swineford
Carrowbaun	60	Burrishoole	Burrishoole	Newport
Carrowbaun	321	Gallen	Meelick	Swineford
Carrowbaun	491	Murrisk	Oughaval	Westport
Carrowbeg	308	Burrishoole	Islandeady	Westport
Carrowbeg	107	Clanmorris	Crossboyne	Claremorris
Carrowbeg	626	Clanmorris	Kilcolman	Claremorris
Carrowbeg	101	Gallen	Kilconduff	Swineford
Carrowbeg	197	Gallen	Killasser	Swineford
Carrowbeg	137	Burrishoole	Kilmeena	Westport
Carrowbeg	1,104	Costello	Kilmovee	Swineford
Carrowbeg	118	Murrisk	Oughaval	Westport
Carrowbeg (fergus)	49	Burrishoole	Burrishoole	Newport
Carrowbeg East	137	Clanmorris	Crossboyne	Claremorris
Carrowbeg North	138	Burrishoole	Burrishoole	Newport
Carrowbeg South	112	Burrishoole	Burrishoole	Newport
Carrowbeg West	41	Clanmorris	Crossboyne	Claremorris
Carrowbrack	96	Kilmaine	Mayo	Ballinrobe
Carrowbrinoge	365	Carra	Aglish	Castlebar
Carrowcally	109	Burrishoole	Kilmeena	Westport
Carrowcanada	497	Gallen	Kilconduff	Swineford
Carrowcastle	294	Gallen	Bohola	Castlebar
Carrowcastle	810	Gallen	Kilgarvan	Ballina
Carrowclaggan	94	Murrisk	Kilgeever	Westport
Carrowcloghagh	162	Tirawley	Crossmolina	Ballina
Carrowclogher	334	Carra	Ballyhean	Castlebar
Carrowconeen	72	Gallen	Kilgarvan	Ballina
Carrowconnell	104	Gallen	Kildacommoge	Castlebar
Carrowconor	213	Clanmorris	Crossboyne	Claremorris
Carrowcor	362	Tirawley	Kilbride	Killala
Carrowcor	124	Costello	Knock	Claremorris
Carrowcrin	227	Tirawley	Ardagh	Ballina
Carrowcrom	477	Gallen	Kilgarvan	Ballina
Carrowcuilleen	899	Tirawley	Lackan	Killala
Carrowdoogan	498	Gallen	Attymass	Ballina
Carroweeny	408	Gallen	Killasser	Swineford
Carrowgallda	463	Gallen	Templemore	Swineford
Carrowgarve	206	Burrishoole	Achill	Newport
Carrowgarve	201	Clanmorris	Balla	Castlebar
Carrowgarve	214	Tirawley	Kilbelfad	Ballina
Carrowgarve North	315	Tirawley	Crossmolina	Ballina
Carrowgarve South	676	Tirawley	Crossmolina	Ballina
Carrowgowan	168	Gallen	Bohola	Castlebar
Carrowhall	152	Carra	Rosslee	Ballinrobe
Carrowhawny	118	Costello	Annagh	Claremorris
Carrowjames	176	Carra	Drum	Castlebar
Carrowkeel	386	Tirawley	Addergoole	Castlebar
Carrowkeel	54	Burrishoole	Aghagower	Westport
Carrowkeel	185	Gallen	Bohola	Swineford
Carrowkeel	141	Carra	Burriscarra	Castlebar
Carrowkeel	87	Burrishoole	Burrishoole	Newport
Carrowkeel	285	Tirawley	Crossmolina	Ballina
Carrowkeel	455	Erris	Kilcommon	Belmullet
Carrowkeel	281	Kilmaine	Kilmolara	Ballinrobe
Carrowkeel	137	Carra	Manulla	Castlebar
Carrowkeel	109	Murrisk	Oughaval	Westport
Carrowkeel	184	Tirawley	Rathreagh	Killala
Carrowkeel	146	Clanmorris	Tagheen	Claremorris
Carrowkeel	173	Carra	Turlough	Castlebar
Carrowkeel East	206	Costello	Annagh	Claremorris
Carrowkeel North	426	Kilmaine	Kilcommon	Ballinrobe
Carrowkeel South	100	Kilmaine	Kilcommon	Ballinrobe
Carrowkeel West	164	Costello	Annagh	Claremorris
Carrowkeeran	86	Murrisk	Oughaval	Westport
Carrowkelly	305	Tirawley	Ballysakeery	Ballina
Carrowkennedy	381	Murrisk	Aghagower	Westport
Carrowkeribly	1,737	Gallen	Attymass	Ballina
Carrowkibbock Lower	177	Tirawley	Doonfeeny	Killala
Carrowkibbock Upper	333	Tirawley	Doonfeeny	Killala
Carrowkilleen	800	Tirawley	Crossmolina	Ballina
Carrowkilleen	129	Clanmorris	Kilcolman	Claremorris
Carrowkilleen	295	Kilmaine	Robeen	Ballinrobe
Carrowleagh	3,143	Gallen	Kilgarvan	Ballina
Carrowlena	84	Clanmorris	Crossboyne	Claremorris
Carrowliam Beg	311	Gallen	Killasser	Swineford
Carrowliam More	330	Gallen	Killasser	Swineford
Carrowlisdooaun	211	Carra	Touaghty	Ballinrobe
Carrowmacloughlin	600	Murrisk	Oughaval	Westport
Carrowmacloughlin	242	Carra	Turlough	Castlebar
Carrowmacshane	306	Tirawley	Lackan	Killala
Carrowmarley	171	Clanmorris	Crossboyne	Claremorris
Carrowmoney	285	Carra	Ballyovey	Ballinrobe
**Carrowmore**	Town	Kilmaine	Kilmainemore	Ballinrobe
Carrowmore	467	Murrisk	Aghagower	Westport
Carrowmore	134	Kilmaine	Ballinrobe	Ballinrobe
Carrowmore	263	Gallen	Bohola	Swineford
Carrowmore	193	Burrishoole	Burrishoole	Newport
Carrowmore	163	Clanmorris	Crossboyne	Claremorris
Carrowmore	358	Tirawley	Kilbelfad	Ballina
Carrowmore	432	Tirawley	Kilbride	Killala
Carrowmore	322	Kilmaine	Kilcommon	Ballinrobe
Carrowmore	1,356	Erris	Kilcommon	Belmullet
Carrowmore	688	Murrisk	Kilgeever	Westport
Carrowmore	349	Gallen	Killasser	Swineford
Carrowmore	445	Kilmaine	Kilmainemore	Ballinrobe
Carrowmore	308	Kilmaine	Kilmainemore	Ballinrobe
Carrowmore	613	Costello	Knock	Claremorris
Carrowmore	478	Tirawley	Lackan	Killala
Carrowmore	239	Carra	Manulla	Castlebar
Carrowmore	89	Kilmaine	Moorgagagh	Ballinrobe
Carrowmore	144	Clanmorris	Tagheen	Claremorris
Carrowmore North	275	Carra	Drum	Castlebar
Carrowmore South	46	Carra	Drum	Castlebar
Carrowmore West	261	Costello	Annagh	Claremorris
Carrowmoremoy	331	Gallen	Killasser	Swineford
Carrownaclea	308	Burrishoole	Islandeady	Westport
**Carrownacon** (Carnacon)	264	Carra	Burriscarra	Ballinrobe
Carrownacross	110	Gallen	Kildacommoge	Castlebar
Carrownacross	115	Gallen	Meelick	Swineford
Carrownaculla	347	Gallen	Kilconduff	Swineford
Carrownageeragh	33	Gallen	Killasser	Swineford
Carrownageeragh	269	Gallen	Killedan	Swineford
Carrownaglogh	2,294	Erris	Kilcommon	Belmullet
Carrownaglogh	3,515	Gallen	Kilgarvan	Ballina
Carrownagreggaun	200	Carra	Burriscarra	Ballinrobe
Carrownagurraun	50	Kilmaine	Kilmolara	Ballinrobe
Carrownahaltore	34	Carra	Touaghty	Ballinrobe
Carrownahaun	531	Clanmorris	Balla	Castlebar
Carrownakilly	57	Kilmaine	Kilmolara	Ballinrobe
Carrownalecka	278	Kilmaine	Ballinrobe	Ballinrobe
Carrownaltore	138	Carra	Aglish	Castlebar
Carrownalurgan	267	Murrisk	Oughaval	Westport
Carrownamallaght	334	Costello	Knock	Claremorris
Carrownaraha	468	Gallen	Templemore	Castlebar
Carrownaskeha	118	Clanmorris	Kilcolman	Claremorris
Carrowncurry	152	Carra	Aglish	Castlebar
Carrowndangan	543	Gallen	Killedan	Swineford
Carrowneden	572	Costello	Aghamore	Swineford
Carrowneden	416	Costello	Annagh	Claremorris
Carrowneden	216	Tirawley	Kilbride	Killala
Carrowneden	555	Gallen	Killasser	Swineford
Carrownisky	400	Tirawley	Doonfeeny	Killala
Carrownisky	979	Murrisk	Kilgeever	Westport
Carrownlabaun	731	Gallen	Kilgarvan	Ballina
Carrownlacka	720	Costello	Kilmovee	Swineford
Carrownlough	363	Clanmorris	Crossboyne	Claremorris
Carrownluggaun	45	Costello	Bekan	Claremorris
Carrownskehaun	241	Clanmorris	Crossboyne	Claremorris
Carrownteeaun	314	Gallen	Killedan	Swineford
Carrowntleva	383	Gallen	Bohola	Swineford
Carrowntober	235	Costello	Kilbeagh	Swineford
Carrowntober Eighter	93	Carra	Manulla	Castlebar
Carrowntober Oughter	100	Carra	Manulla	Castlebar
Carrowntreila	426	Tirawley	Ballynahaglish	Ballina
Carrownturly	163	Kilmaine	Kilmainebeg	Ballinrobe
Carrownurlaur	151	Carra	Breaghwy	Castlebar
Carrowoughteragh	234	Kilmaine	Kilmainebeg	Ballinrobe
Carrowreagh	86	Kilmaine	Kilmainemore	Ballinrobe
Carrowreagh	169	Tirawley	Ballysakeery	Ballina
Carrowreagh	304	Costello	Bekan	Claremorris
Carrowreagh	253	Clanmorris	Kilcolman	Claremorris
Carrowreagh	791	Gallen	Kilgarvan	Ballina
Carrowreagh	901	Gallen	Killedan	Swineford
Carrowreagh	203	Gallen	Meelick	Swineford
Carrowreaghmony	148	Carra	Touaghty	Ballinrobe
Carrowrevagh	907	Murrisk	Aghagower	Westport
Carrowroger	133	Gallen	Kildacommoge	Castlebar
Carrowsallagh	331	Burrishoole	Burrishoole	Newport
Carrowscoltia	146	Costello	Aghamore	Swineford
Carrowskeheen	419	Tirawley	Addergoole	Castlebar
Carrowslattery	184	Kilmaine	Robeen	Ballinrobe
Carrowsteelagh	273	Tirawley	Kilcummin	Killala
Carrowsteelaun	237	Clanmorris	Crossboyne	Claremorris
Carrowsteige	403	Erris	Kilcommon	Belmullet
Carrowstootagh	218	Burrishoole	Islandeady	Westport
Carrowtrasna	230	Tirawley	Kilcummin	Killala
Carrowvaneen	245	Tirawley	Kilbelfad	Ballina
Cartoon	212	Tirawley	Killala	Killala
Cartoor	132	Murrisk	Oughaval	Westport
Cartron	1,886	Burrishoole	Achill	Newport
Cartron	47	Tirawley	Addergoole	Castlebar
Cartron	279	Costello	Aghamore	Swineford
Cartron	87	Costello	Annagh	Claremorris
Cartron	125	Gallen	Attymass	Ballina
Cartron	129	Kilmaine	Ballinrobe	Ballinrobe
Cartron	460	Costello	Kilbeagh	Swineford
Cartron	126	Clanmorris	Kilcolman	Claremorris
Cartron	501	Gallen	Killasser	Swineford
Cartron	147	Gallen	Killedan	Swineford
Cartron	227	Burrishoole	Kilmaclasser	Westport
Cartron	76	Erris	Kilmore	Belmullet
Cartron	60	Carra	Manulla	Castlebar
Cartron (French)	50	Kilmaine	Kilmainemore	Ballinrobe
Cartron (Kirwan)	52	Kilmaine	Kilmainemore	Ballinrobe
Cartron (Lindsay)	129	Kilmaine	Kilmainemore	Ballinrobe
Cartron North	227	Costello	Aghamore	Swineford
Cartronbower	233	Carra	Ballintober	Castlebar
Cartronduff	194	Burrishoole	Islandeady	Westport
Cartrongilbert	88	Tirawley	Crossmolina	Ballina
Cartrongilbert	248	Erris	Kilmore	Belmullet
Cartronmacmanus	147	Gallen	Killasser	Swineford
Cartronnacross	202	Clanmorris	Kilcolman	Claremorris
Cartronrathroe	77	Tirawley	Kilfian	Killala
Cartronstanton	33	Carra	Drum	Castlebar
Cashel	1,687	Burrishoole	Achill	Newport
Cashel	305	Carra	Islandeady	Castlebar
Cashel	366	Burrishoole	Islandeady	Westport
Cashel	417	Costello	Kilbeagh	Swineford
Cashel	312	Tirawley	Kilcummin	Killala
Cashel	394	Kilmaine	Robeen	Ballinrobe
Cashel	589	Gallen	Toomore	Swineford
Cashel Lower	151	Carra	Turlough	Castlebar
Cashel Upper	244	Carra	Turlough	Castlebar
Cashelard	227	Costello	Castlemore	Castlereagh
Cashelcolaun	206	Costello	Castlemore	Castlereagh
Cashelduff	702	Costello	Kilbeagh	Swineford
Cashellahenny	242	Costello	Kilmovee	Swineford
Cashels	63	Costello	Aghamore	Swineford
Casheltourly	331	Costello	Aghamore	Swineford
Cashlancran	267	Kilmaine	Kilmolara	Ballinrobe
Castle Island	4	Tirawley	Crossmolina	Ballina
Castleaffy	131	Burrishoole	Kilmeena	Westport
**Castlebar**	Town	Carra	Aglish	Castlebar
Castlebarnagh	245	Gallen	Kilconduff	Swineford
Castleburke	207	Carra	Ballintober	Castlebar
Castlecarra	496	Carra	Burriscarra	Ballinrobe
Castlecrunnoge	159	Gallen	Kilconduff	Swineford
Castlegar	270	Clanmorris	Kilcolman	Claremorris
Castlehill	414	Tirawley	Addergoole	Ballina
Castlehill	349	Tirawley	Crossmolina	Ballina
Castlehill	1,188	Erris	Kilcommon	Newport
Castlelackan Demesne	292	Tirawley	Lackan	Killala
Castlelucas	58	Carra	Rosslee	Castlebar
Castlemagarret North	262	Clanmorris	Crossboyne	Claremorris
Castlemagarretpark New	507	Clanmorris	Crossboyne	Claremorris
Castlemagarretpark Old	170	Clanmorris	Crossboyne	Claremorris
Castlemore (or Ballymaging)	285	Costello	Castlemore	Castlereagh
Castlenageeha	169	Tirawley	Kilcummin	Killala
Castlereagh	309	Clanmorris	Crossboyne	Claremorris
Castlereagh	470	Tirawley	Killala	Killala
Castleroyan	514	Gallen	Kilconduff	Swineford
Castlesheenaghan	392	Gallen	Meelick	Swineford
Castletown	155	Kilmaine	Ballinchalla	Ballinrobe
Castletown	624	Kilmaine	Cong	Ballinrobe
Castletown	285	Tirawley	Kilbride	Killala
Castletown	372	Tirawley	Lackan	Killala
Catfort	165	Carra	Drum	Castlebar
Caulicaun	12	Burrishoole	Burrishoole	Newport
Caurans Lower	243	Carra	Turlough	Castlebar
Caurans Upper (or Oughterard)	119	Carra	Turlough	Castlebar
Cavan	247	Kilmaine	Ballinrobe	Ballinrobe
Cavanquarter	137	Kilmaine	Ballinrobe	Ballinrobe
Cave	155	Costello	Bekan	Claremorris
Chain Island	2	Tirawley	Crossmolina	Ballina
Cherryfield	70	Costello	Bekan	Claremorris
Church Island	7	Carra	Ballintober	Castlebar
Churchfield	403	Costello	Knock	Claremorris
Churchfield	30	Murrisk	Oughaval	Westport
Churchpark	62	Costello	Annagh	Claremorris
Claddy	1,038	Murrisk	Aghagower	Westport
Claggan	174	Burrishoole	Achill	Newport
Claggan	1,066	Erris	Kilcommon	Newport
Claggan	116	Murrisk	Kilgeever	Westport
Claggan	190	Burrishoole	Kilmeena	Westport
Clagganmountain	1,848	Erris	Kilcommon	Newport
Claggarnagh East	990	Tirawley	Addergoole	Castlebar
Claggarnagh East	309	Burrishoole	Islandeady	Westport
Claggarnagh West	963	Tirawley	Addergoole	Castlebar
Claggarnagh West	372	Burrishoole	Islandeady	Westport
Clagnagh	95	Costello	Bekan	Claremorris
**Clare**	Town	Clanmorris	Kilcolman	Claremorris
Clare	1,086	Clanmorris	Kilcolman	Claremorris
Clareen	177	Kilmaine	Kilcommon	Ballinrobe
Claremount	313	Clanmorris	Kilcolman	Claremorris
Clashcame	673	Murrisk	Kilgeever	Westport
Classaghroe	208	Costello	Annagh	Claremorris
Clerhaun	115	Murrisk	Oughaval	Westport
Cliff Island	4	Tirawley	Kilbelfad	Ballina
Cloghadockan	146	Carra	Turlough	Castlebar
Cloghan	65	Murrisk	Oughaval	Westport
Cloghanlucas North	266	Carra	Rosslee	Castlebar
Cloghannageeragh	283	Carra	Rosslee	Castlebar
Cloghans	239	Tirawley	Kilbelfad	Ballina
Cloghans Beg	227	Kilmaine	Kilmainemore	Ballinrobe
Cloghans More	165	Kilmaine	Kilmainemore	Ballinrobe
Cloghboley	154	Carra	Kildacommoge	Castlebar
Cloghbrack Far	1,042	Tirawley	Addergoole	Castlebar
Cloghbrack Near	798	Tirawley	Addergoole	Castlebar
Clogher	303	Carra	Burriscarra	Castlebar
Clogher	197	Burrishoole	Islandeady	Westport
Clogher	406	Kilmaine	Kilcommon	Ballinrobe
Clogher	395	Erris	Kilmore	Belmullet
Clogher	297	Carra	Turlough	Castlebar
Clogher Beg	126	Clanmorris	Tagheen	Claremorris
Clogher More	244	Clanmorris	Tagheen	Claremorris
Clogherduff	52	Clanmorris	Tagheen	Claremorris
Clogherowan	145	Carra	Drum	Castlebar
Cloghmore	168	Burrishoole	Achill	Newport
Cloghmoyne	706	Kilmaine	Shrule	Ballinrobe
Cloghvoley	492	Costello	Aghamore	Swineford
Clonainra	532	Gallen	Killasser	Swineford
Cloonacannana	329	Gallen	Kilconduff	Swineford
Cloonacauna	105	Tirawley	Kilbelfad	Ballina
Cloonacurry	194	Costello	Bekan	Claremorris
Cloonagalloon	155	Gallen	Meelick	Swineford
Cloonagh	169	Murrisk	Aghagower	Westport
Cloonagh	263	Carra	Aglish	Castlebar
Cloonagh	111	Carra	Drum	Castlebar
Cloonagh	301	Clanmorris	Tagheen	Claremorris
Cloonagh Beg & Knockegan	178	Tirawley	Ardagh	Ballina
Cloonagh More	384	Tirawley	Ardagh	Ballina
Cloonaghboy	295	Gallen	Kilconduff	Swineford
Cloonaghduff	161	Carra	Drum	Castlebar
Cloonaghduff	26	Clanmorris	Kilcolman	Claremorris
Cloonaghmanagh	56	Murrisk	Kilgeever	Westport
Cloonaghmore	176	Carra	Ballyhean	Castlebar
Cloonaghmore	143	Carra	Breaghwy	Castlebar
Cloonaghmore	137	Tirawley	Moygawnagh	Killala
Cloonakillina	279	Costello	Kilturra	Swineford
Cloonalaghan	235	Tirawley	Lackan	Killala
Cloonaleedin	56	Tirawley	Kilfian	Killala
Cloonalison	193	Costello	Kilbeagh	Swineford
Cloonalough	74	Tirawley	Ballysakeery	Ballina
Cloonamore	645	Murrisk	Inishbofin	Clifden
Cloonan	239	Burrishoole	Islandeady	Westport
Cloonanaff	297	Kilmaine	Kilcommon	Ballinrobe
Cloonanass	126	Tirawley	Lackan	Killala
Cloonapisha	129	Tirawley	Ardagh	Ballina
Cloonark	79	Kilmaine	Ballinrobe	Ballinrobe
Cloonaverry	75	Tirawley	Templemurry	Killala
Cloonavullaun	212	Costello	Castlemore	Castlereagh
Cloonaweema	225	Costello	Kilbeagh	Swineford
Cloonawillin	134	Tirawley	Ballysakeery	Ballina
Cloonawillin	173	Tirawley	Crossmolina	Ballina
Cloonbanaun	311	Kilmaine	Shrule	Ballinrobe
Cloonbaul	270	Clanmorris	Mayo	Claremorris
Cloonbonniff	507	Clanmorris	Crossboyne	Claremorris
Cloonbookeighter	244	Costello	Bekan	Claremorris
Cloonbookoughter	315	Costello	Bekan	Claremorris
Cloonboorhy	266	Carra	Burriscarra	Castlebar
Cloonboy	445	Clanmorris	Kilcolman	Claremorris
Cloonboy	180	Tirawley	Templemurry	Killala
Cloonbrone	51	Tirawley	Ardagh	Ballina
Cloonbulban	242	Costello	Bekan	Claremorris
Cloonbullig	115	Costello	Annagh	Claremorris
Clooncah	145	Costello	Aghamore	Swineford
Clooncan	286	Kilmaine	Robeen	Ballinrobe
Clooncanavan	117	Burrishoole	Kilmaclasser	Westport
Clooncarha	204	Costello	Kilmovee	Swineford
Clooncarrabaun	123	Murrisk	Kilgeever	Westport
Clooncleevragh	142	Gallen	Killasser	Swineford
Cloonconlan	464	Gallen	Templemore	Castlebar
Cloonconneelaun	188	Kilmaine	Kilmainemore	Ballinrobe
Cloonconor	36	Clanmorris	Kilcolman	Claremorris
Cloonconra	197	Gallen	Templemore	Castlebar
Cloonconragh East	147	Carra	Ballyhean	Castlebar
Cloonconragh West	281	Carra	Ballyhean	Castlebar
Cloonconway	83	Tirawley	Rathreagh	Killala
Clooncormick	731	Kilmaine	Robeen	Ballinrobe
Clooncorraun	256	Kilmaine	Ballinrobe	Ballinrobe
Clooncous	153	Costello	Kilbeagh	Swineford
Clooncrooeel	147	Carra	Ballintober	Castlebar
Cloondace	354	Costello	Knock	Claremorris
Cloondacon	247	Burrishoole	Aghagower	Westport
Cloondaff	2,130	Tirawley	Addergoole	Castlebar
Cloondaver	151	Kilmaine	Robeen	Ballinrobe
Cloondeash	261	Carra	Ballyhean	Castlebar
Cloondinnaire	185	Clanmorris	Tagheen	Claremorris
Cloondoolough	230	Gallen	Killedan	Swineford
Cloondroon	243	Clanmorris	Kilcolman	Claremorris
Cloonean	257	Costello	Aghamore	Swineford
Cloonee	459	Kilmaine	Ballinrobe	Ballinrobe
Cloonee	455	Carra	Ballyovey	Ballinrobe
Clooneen	259	Kilmaine	Kilcommon	Ballinrobe
Clooneen	169	Burrishoole	Kilmeena	Westport
Clooneen	328	Erris	Kilmore	Belmullet
Clooneen	381	Gallen	Meelick	Swineford
Clooneen	77	Murrisk	Oughaval	Westport
Clooneencarra	139	Carra	Touaghty	Ballinrobe
Clooneenkillew	174	Carra	Touaghty	Ballinrobe
Clooneigh	115	Tirawley	Ardagh	Ballina
Cloonengh	261	Kilmaine	Ballinrobe	Ballinrobe
Cloonerneen	441	Kilmaine	Ballinrobe	Ballinrobe
Clooneshil	221	Burrishoole	Burrishoole	Newport
Cloonfadda	202	Tirawley	Ballysakeery	Ballina
Cloonfane	265	Costello	Kilbeagh	Swineford
Cloonfaughna	160	Costello	Knock	Claremorris
Cloonfaulus	605	Costello	Kilmovee	Swineford
Cloonfeaghra	444	Costello	Kilmovee	Swineford
Cloonfeightrim	627	Costello	Kilturra	Swineford
Cloonfert	206	Carra	Ballyhean	Castlebar
Cloonfinish	353	Gallen	Killasser	Swineford
Cloonfinnaun	469	Gallen	Kilconduff	Swineford
Cloonflyn	298	Carra	Rosslee	Castlebar
Cloonfoher	283	Burrishoole	Burrishoole	Newport
Cloongawnagh	328	Clanmorris	Kilcolman	Claremorris
Cloongawnagh	328	Clanmorris	Kilcolman	Claremorris
Cloongawnagh	234	Kilmaine	Kilmainemore	Ballinrobe
Cloongawnagh (Burke)	838	Costello	Aghamore	Swineford
Cloongawnagh (Cosgrave)	586	Costello	Aghamore	Swineford
Cloongee	693	Gallen	Templemore	Swineford
Cloonglasney	188	Tirawley	Ardagh	Ballina
Cloongowla	617	Kilmaine	Ballinrobe	Ballinrobe
Cloongullaun	452	Gallen	Kilconduff	Swineford
Cloonierin	1,045	Costello	Kilmovee	Swineford
Clooninshin	144	Gallen	Meelick	Swineford
Cloonkedagh	110	Gallen	Killedan	Swineford
Cloonkee	469	Tirawley	Kilfian	Ballina
Cloonkeeghan	83	Clanmorris	Tagheen	Claremorris
Cloonkeeghan Commons	343	Kilmaine	Kilmainemore	Ballinrobe
Cloonkeen	560	Carra	Aglish	Castlebar
Cloonkeen	135	Burrishoole	Kilmeena	Westport
Cloonkeen	97	Clanmorris	Tagheen	Claremorris
Cloonkelly	104	Tirawley	Crossmolina	Ballina
Cloonkerry	400	Kilmaine	Ballinrobe	Ballinrobe
Cloonkesh	359	Carra	Turlough	Castlebar
Cloonlagheen	404	Carra	Ballyovey	Ballinrobe
Cloonlara	345	Costello	Bekan	Claremorris
Cloonlara	488	Gallen	Kilconduff	Swineford
Cloonlarhan	534	Costello	Kilbeagh	Swineford
Cloonlaur	84	Murrisk	Kilgeever	Westport
Cloonlavis Lower	268	Clanmorris	Knock	Claremorris
Cloonlavis Upper	166	Clanmorris	Knock	Claremorris
Cloonlee	463	Costello	Knock	Claremorris
Cloonliffen	185	Kilmaine	Ballinrobe	Ballinrobe
Cloonlumney	2,200	Costello	Kilcolman	Castlereagh
Cloonlumney	324	Gallen	Kilconduff	Swineford
Cloonlynchaghaun	106	Carra	Drum	Castlebar
Cloonlyon	229	Costello	Kilbeagh	Swineford
Cloonmaan	41	Tirawley	Ballysakeery	Ballina
Cloonmeen	183	Costello	Kilcolman	Castlereagh
Cloonmeen East	386	Costello	Kilbeagh	Swineford
Cloonmeen West	263	Costello	Kilbeagh	Swineford
Cloonmonad	159	Murrisk	Oughaval	Westport
Cloonmore	273	Clanmorris	Crossboyne	Claremorris
Cloonmore	161	Costello	Kilbeagh	Swineford
Cloonmore Lower	396	Clanmorris	Kilcolman	Claremorris
Cloonmore Upper	356	Clanmorris	Kilcolman	Claremorris
Cloonmung	382	Gallen	Toomore	Swineford
Cloonnagashel	486	Kilmaine	Ballinrobe	Ballinrobe
Cloonnagleragh	238	Carra	Turlough	Castlebar
Cloonnagleragh	313	Costello	Knock	Claremorris
Cloonnagoppoge	156	Carra	Touaghty	Ballinrobe
Cloonnahulty	195	Costello	Aghamore	Swineford
Cloonnameeltoge & Caherrevagh	623	Kilmaine	Kilmainemore	Ballinrobe
Cloonnamna	749	Costello	Kilmovee	Swineford
Cloonooragh	432	Tirawley	Crossmolina	Ballina
Cloonshanbo	181	Clanmorris	Mayo	Claremorris
Cloonshinnagh	174	Tirawley	Ballysakeery	Ballina
Cloonshinnagh	170	Carra	Ballyhean	Castlebar
Cloonskeagh	196	Tirawley	Kilfian	Killala
Cloonskill	333	Murrisk	Aghagower	Westport
Cloonskirtaun	43	Tirawley	Killala	Killala
Cloonsnaghta	131	Tirawley	Moygawnagh	Killala
Cloonsunna	60	Carra	Ballyhean	Castlebar
Cloonta	491	Gallen	Kilgarvan	Ballina
Cloontakilla	1,178	Erris	Kilcommon	Belmullet
Cloontakillew	56	Tirawley	Kilfian	Killala
Cloontally	131	Tirawley	Kilbelfad	Ballina
Cloontarriff	292	Costello	Knock	Claremorris
Cloontarriff	97	Costello	Aghamore	Swineford
Cloontooa	510	Clanmorris	Kilcolman	Claremorris
Cloontubbrid	579	Gallen	Killasser	Swineford
Cloontubbrid	411	Carra	Turlough	Castlebar
Cloontumper	626	Costello	Annagh	Claremorris
Cloonturk	323	Costello	Aghamore	Swineford
Cloonturk	164	Tirawley	Ballynahaglish	Ballina
Cloonturnaun	155	Costello	Knock	Claremorris
Cloonty	179	Murrisk	Kilgeever	Westport
Cloontybaunan	122	Carra	Breaghwy	Castlebar
Cloontykillew	238	Tirawley	Kilmoremoy	Ballina
Cloonyarigaun	202	Tirawley	Kilbelfad	Ballina
Cloonycollaran	101	Clanmorris	Kilcolman	Claremorris
Cloonygowan	208	Gallen	Meelick	Swineford
Cloonygunnaun	89	Tirawley	Kilbelfad	Ballina
Cloonyvollow	122	Tirawley	Kilbelfad	Ballina
Clossaghroe	313	Tirawley	Ballynahaglish	Ballina
Cloyrawer	177	Tirawley	Kilfian	Killala
Cluddaun	1,772	Tirawley	Kilfian	Killala
Clyard	179	Kilmaine	Kilmainemore	Ballinrobe
Clydagh	1,667	Tirawley	Kilfian	Killala
Clylea (or Greyfield)	92	Kilmaine	Kilmainemore	Ballinrobe
Clynish	80	Burrishoole	Kilmeena	Westport
Coarse Island	4	Tirawley	Addergoole	Castlebar
Coarsefield	204	Clanmorris	Tagheen	Claremorris
Coarsepark	87	Carra	Aglish	Castlebar
Cogaula	400	Burrishoole	Islandeady	Westport
Cogaula	477	Carra	Ballintober	Castlebar
Colladussaun	163	Tirawley	Kilbelfad	Ballina
Collagh	299	Gallen	Meelick	Swineford
Collan Beg	16	Burrishoole	Kilmeena	Westport
Collan More	196	Burrishoole	Kilmeena	Westport
Cominch	353	Tirawley	Crossmolina	Ballina
Commauns	515	Carra	Turlough	Castlebar
Commons	11	Clanmorris	Crossboyne	Claremorris
Commons	37	Tirawley	Kilmoremoy	Ballina
Commons	4	Kilmaine	Shrule	Ballinrobe
Conaghra	461	Tirawley	Doonfeeny	Killala
Conaghra	204	Tirawley	Lackan	Killala
**Cong**	Town	Kilmaine	Cong	Ballinrobe
Cong North	12	Kilmaine	Cong	Ballinrobe
Cong South	9	Kilmaine	Cong	Ballinrobe
Conloon	280	Carra	Turlough	Castlebar
Conor\'s Island	15	Carra	Burriscarra	Ballinrobe
Conrea	40	Burrishoole	Kilmeena	Westport
Coogue Middle	282	Costello	Aghamore	Claremorris
Coogue North	329	Costello	Aghamore	Claremorris
Coogue South	333	Costello	Aghamore	Claremorris
Cool Lodge	107	Carra	Ballyhean	Castlebar
Coolaghbaun	112	Clanmorris	Mayo	Claremorris
Coolaghbaun	132	Kilmaine	Kilcommon	Ballinrobe
Coolaght	448	Clanmorris	Kilcolman	Claremorris
Coolaghtane	118	Costello	Kilcolman	Castlereagh
Coolavally	242	Kilmaine	Cong	Ballinrobe
Coolbarreen	212	Burrishoole	Kilmeena	Westport
Coolcashla	193	Gallen	Killasser	Swineford
Coolcon	284	Kilmaine	Kilcommon	Claremorris
Coolcran	190	Tirawley	Kilmoremoy	Ballina
Coolcran	36	Tirawley	Ballysakeery	Ballina
Coolcran	227	Tirawley	Kilbelfad	Ballina
Coolcronaun	557	Tirawley	Ballynahaglish	Ballina
Cooleen	129	Kilmaine	Kilmainemore	Ballinrobe
Cooley	74	Carra	Ballyhean	Castlebar
Coollagagh	720	Gallen	Killasser	Swineford
Coollena	104	Costello	Kilcolman	Castlereagh
Coollisduff	390	Kilmaine	Kilmolara	Ballinrobe
Coollisduff	101	Kilmaine	Kilmainemore	Ballinrobe
Coolloughra	232	Costello	Bekan	Claremorris
Coolloughra	56	Burrishoole	Aghagower	Westport
Coolmakean	231	Clanmorris	Crossboyne	Claremorris
Coolnabinna	1,356	Tirawley	Crossmolina	Ballina
Coolnafarna	378	Costello	Annagh	Claremorris
Coolnaha North	484	Costello	Aghamore	Swineford
Coolnaha South	631	Costello	Aghamore	Swineford
Coolroe	198	Clanmorris	Crossboyne	Claremorris
Coolturk	1,261	Tirawley	Crossmolina	Ballina
Coolylaughnan	345	Kilmaine	Robeen	Ballinrobe
Coonealcauraun	706	Tirawley	Ballysakeery	Ballina
Coonealmore	368	Tirawley	Ballysakeery	Ballina
Cooslughoga	39	Kilmaine	Cong	Ballinrobe
Corbally	198	Clanmorris	Kilcolman	Claremorris
Corclogh	343	Erris	Kilcommon	Belmullet
Corclogh	1,050	Erris	Kilmore	Belmullet
Corcullin	493	Tirawley	Crossmolina	Ballina
Cordarragh	379	Gallen	Killedan	Swineford
Cordarragh North	448	Murrisk	Aghagower	Westport
Cordarragh South	1,086	Murrisk	Aghagower	Westport
Cordroon	225	Kilmaine	Cong	Ballinrobe
Corgarriff	481	Costello	Kilmovee	Swineford
Corgarve	69	Kilmaine	Cong	Ballinrobe
Corhawnagh	189	Costello	Aghamore	Swineford
Corlee	476	Gallen	Killasser	Swineford
Corlisland	4	Clanmorris	Mayo	Claremorris
Corlummin	454	Tirawley	Ballynahaglish	Ballina
Cornabavoley	68	Carra	Rosslee	Castlebar
Cornacarta	183	Costello	Annagh	Claremorris
Cornacartan	299	Kilmaine	Kilmainebeg	Ballinrobe
Cornagashlaun	475	Burrishoole	Islandeady	Westport
Cornageahta	84	Costello	Aghamore	Swineford
Cornageeha	215	Gallen	Killasser	Swineford
Cornalassan	185	Kilmaine	Robeen	Ballinrobe
Cornamarrow	264	Carra	Ballyhean	Castlebar
Cornamonaster	178	Carra	Rosslee	Castlebar
Cornanaff	65	Gallen	Kildacommoge	Castlebar
Cornanagh	342	Kilmaine	Robeen	Ballinrobe
Cornanool	132	Carra	Islandeady	Castlebar
Cornaroya	361	Kilmaine	Ballinrobe	Ballinrobe
Cornaveagh	200	Carra	Ballyhean	Castlebar
Cornaveagh	124	Gallen	Kilconduff	Swineford
Cornehan	2	Kilmaine	Shrule	Ballinrobe
Cornfield	594	Kilmaine	Robeen	Ballinrobe
Corrabaun	163	Carra	Drum	Castlebar
Corracrow	538	Kilmaine	Kilcommon	Ballinrobe
Corradrish	89	Carra	Aglish	Castlebar
Corradrishy	818	Gallen	Attymass	Ballina
Corragaun	91	Burrishoole	Burrishoole	Newport
Corragaun	184	Murrisk	Kilgeever	Westport
Corragooly	244	Gallen	Killedan	Swineford
Corrahoor	198	Costello	Kilbeagh	Swineford
Corratanvally	224	Carra	Breaghwy	Castlebar
Corratowick	187	Burrishoole	Kilmeena	Westport
Corraun	136	Kilmaine	Kilmainemore	Ballinrobe
Corraun	441	Gallen	Kildacommoge	Castlebar
Corraun	573	Costello	Annagh	Claremorris
Corraunboy	76	Burrishoole	Burrishoole	Newport
Corravegaun East	140	Tirawley	Ballynahaglish	Ballina
Corravegaun West	274	Tirawley	Ballynahaglish	Ballina
Corravokeen	809	Tirawley	Moygawnagh	Killala
Correens	95	Tirawley	Moygawnagh	Killala
Corrower	864	Gallen	Attymass	Ballina
Corroy	187	Tirawley	Ballynahaglish	Ballina
Corryaughany	364	Murrisk	Kilgeever	Westport
Corrydavit	493	Murrisk	Kilgeever	Westport
Corrymailley	353	Murrisk	Kilgeever	Westport
Corskeagh	83	Clanmorris	Mayo	Claremorris
Corveagh Lower	299	Murrisk	Aghagower	Westport
Corveagh Upper	988	Murrisk	Aghagower	Westport
Corvickremon	71	Carra	Rosslee	Castlebar
Corvoderry	3,001	Tirawley	Moygawnagh	Killala
Corvoley	810	Tirawley	Moygawnagh	Killala
Cossallagh	204	Costello	Annagh	Claremorris
Cottage	214	Carra	Breaghwy	Castlebar
Cottage	241	Costello	Annagh	Claremorris
Cow Island	11	Kilmaine	Cong	Ballinrobe
Cragagh	86	Costello	Kilbeagh	Swineford
Craggagh	693	Gallen	Killedan	Swineford
Craggera	32	Gallen	Kilgarvan	Ballina
Craggy	172	Murrisk	Kilgeever	Westport
Cranareen	73	Burrishoole	Kilmeena	Westport
Cranmore	97	Carra	Ballintober	Castlebar
Cranmore	149	Costello	Kilbeagh	Swineford
Crannagh	233	Tirawley	Ardagh	Ballina
Crantahar	119	Clanmorris	Kilcolman	Claremorris
Creagh Demesne	599	Kilmaine	Ballinrobe	Ballinrobe
Creaghanboy	155	Carra	Manulla	Castlebar
Creeragh	141	Carra	Ballyhean	Castlebar
Creevagh	414	Carra	Ballintober	Castlebar
Creevagh	651	Tirawley	Kilcummin	Killala
Creevagh Beg	255	Tirawley	Rathreagh	Killala
Creevagh Middle	251	Kilmaine	Cong	Ballinrobe
Creevagh More	461	Tirawley	Rathreagh	Killala
Creevagh North	247	Kilmaine	Kilmolara	Ballinrobe
Creevagh North	283	Kilmaine	Cong	Ballinrobe
Creevagh South	404	Kilmaine	Kilmolara	Ballinrobe
Creevagh South	414	Kilmaine	Cong	Ballinrobe
Creevaghaun	39	Burrishoole	Burrishoole	Newport
Creevard	222	Clanmorris	Kilvine	Claremorris
Creevaroddaun	195	Kilmaine	Kilmainemore	Ballinrobe
Creeve Island	1	Tirawley	Kilbelfad	Ballina
Creeveeshel	188	Clanmorris	Kilvine	Claremorris
Creevy	476	Tirawley	Crossmolina	Ballina
Cregaree	217	Kilmaine	Cong	Ballinrobe
Cregduff	277	Kilmaine	Ballinrobe	Ballinrobe
Cregduff	188	Kilmaine	Kilcommon	Ballinrobe
Cregduff	248	Kilmaine	Kilmainemore	Ballinrobe
Cregg	178	Carra	Manulla	Castlebar
Creggaballagh	255	Gallen	Killasser	Swineford
Creggagh	475	Gallen	Toomore	Swineford
Creggan	682	Costello	Kilcolman	Castlereagh
Cregganawoddy	462	Murrisk	Kilgeever	Westport
Cregganbaun	368	Murrisk	Kilgeever	Westport
Cregganbeg	631	Tirawley	Doonfeeny	Killala
Cregganbell	295	Carra	Ballyhean	Castlebar
Cregganbrack	341	Costello	Knock	Claremorris
Cregganmore	1,274	Erris	Kilcommon	Belmullet
Creggannagappul	71	Murrisk	Kilgeever	Westport
Creggannaseer	18	Burrishoole	Aghagower	Westport
Creggannavar	91	Carra	Breaghwy	Castlebar
Cregganroe	710	Murrisk	Kilgeever	Westport
Creggarve	342	Kilmaine	Robeen	Ballinrobe
Creggaun	181	Tirawley	Ballynahaglish	Ballina
Creggaun	187	Clanmorris	Mayo	Claremorris
Creggaun	382	Gallen	Killasser	Swineford
Creggaunnahorna	88	Burrishoole	Kilmeena	Westport
Creggawatta	128	Kilmaine	Kilcommon	Ballinrobe
Cregmore (Browne)	174	Kilmaine	Kilmainemore	Ballinrobe
Cregmore (Lynch)	124	Kilmaine	Kilmainemore	Ballinrobe
Cregnafyla	161	Gallen	Toomore	Swineford
Cregnanagh	38	Kilmaine	Kilmainebeg	Ballinrobe
Cregnanagh	131	Kilmaine	Moorgagagh	Ballinrobe
Crillaun	963	Carra	Turlough	Castlebar
Crinnish	459	Erris	Kilcommon	Belmullet
Croaghaun	1,828	Erris	Kilcommon	Belmullet
Croaghaun East	1,552	Tirawley	Moygawnagh	Killala
Croaghaun West	1,409	Tirawley	Moygawnagh	Killala
Croaghrimbeg	875	Carra	Ballintober	Ballinrobe
Croaghrimcarra	1,147	Carra	Ballintober	Ballinrobe
Crockaunrannell	233	Costello	Knock	Claremorris
Crocknacally	1,099	Tirawley	Kilfian	Killala
Croftonpark	476	Tirawley	Kilmoremoy	Ballina
Croghan	180	Tirawley	Killala	Killala
Cross	188	Burrishoole	Kilmeena	Westport
Cross	295	Murrisk	Kilgeever	Westport
Cross (Boyd)	285	Erris	Kilmore	Belmullet
Cross Common	150	Erris	Kilmore	Belmullet
Cross East	465	Kilmaine	Cong	Ballinrobe
Cross East (or Wallace East)	191	Erris	Kilmore	Belmullet
Cross North	16	Costello	Kilcolman	Castlereagh
Cross South	264	Costello	Kilcolman	Castlereagh
Cross West	308	Kilmaine	Cong	Ballinrobe
Cross West (or Wallace West)	224	Erris	Kilmore	Belmullet
Crossard	569	Costello	Aghamore	Swineford
Crossbeg	299	Costello	Aghamore	Swineford
Crossboyne	112	Clanmorris	Crossboyne	Claremorris
Crossmolina	126	Tirawley	Crossmolina	Ballina
Crosspatrick	166	Tirawley	Killala	Killala
Crott	218	Tirawley	Kilbride	Killala
Crott Mountain	1,329	Murrisk	Oughaval	Westport
Crovinish	28	Burrishoole	Kilmeena	Westport
Crowhill	32	Burrishoole	Aghagower	Westport
Crumlin	439	Clanmorris	Kilvine	Claremorris
Crumlin	869	Carra	Turlough	Castlebar
Crunaun	446	Costello	Castlemore	Castlereagh
Cuilbeg	133	Costello	Bekan	Claremorris
Cuildoo	489	Gallen	Killasser	Swineford
Cuilgar	48	Gallen	Killedan	Swineford
Cuilkillew	677	Tirawley	Addergoole	Castlebar
Cuillalea	708	Gallen	Killedan	Swineford
Cuillaloughaun	1,432	Burrishoole	Achill	Newport
Cuillare	95	Carra	Drum	Castlebar
Cuillatinny	158	Costello	Knock	Claremorris
Cuillaun	659	Gallen	Kilconduff	Swineford
Cuillaun	813	Clanmorris	Kilvine	Claremorris
Cuillaun	224	Kilmaine	Robeen	Ballinrobe
Cuilleen	885	Murrisk	Oughaval	Westport
Cuillonaghtan	1,144	Gallen	Killasser	Swineford
Cuilmore	402	Burrishoole	Burrishoole	Newport
Cuilmore	765	Murrisk	Oughaval	Westport
Cuilmore	983	Gallen	Kilconduff	Swineford
Cuilmore	999	Clanmorris	Kilcolman	Claremorris
Cuilmullagh	1,107	Tirawley	Addergoole	Castlebar
Cuiltrasna	267	Gallen	Killedan	Swineford
Cuiltrean	227	Burrishoole	Kilmaclasser	Westport
Cuiltybo	670	Clanmorris	Kilcolman	Claremorris
Cuiltybo	298	Gallen	Kilconduff	Swineford
Cuiltycreaghan	407	Costello	Bekan	Claremorris
Cuing Beg	337	Tirawley	Kilbelfad	Ballina
Cuing More	189	Tirawley	Kilbelfad	Ballina
Cullagh	107	Kilmaine	Shrule	Ballinrobe
Culleens	530	Tirawley	Kilmoremoy	Ballina
Cullentragh	152	Clanmorris	Mayo	Claremorris
Cullentragh	540	Carra	Ballintober	Castlebar
Cullentragh	106	Burrishoole	Burrishoole	Newport
Cullentragh	260	Costello	Bekan	Claremorris
Culliagh	581	Costello	Kilmovee	Swineford
Cullin	505	Gallen	Killasser	Swineford
Culnacleha	395	Costello	Annagh	Claremorris
Cum	297	Tirawley	Addergoole	Castlebar
Cummer	414	Carra	Islandeady	Westport
Cummer	353	Costello	Aghamore	Swineford
Cunlaghfadda	330	Clanmorris	Tagheen	Claremorris
Cunnagher North	682	Carra	Turlough	Castlebar
Cunnagher South	229	Carra	Turlough	Castlebar
Cunnaker	97	Carra	Ballyhean	Castlebar
Curneen	290	Clanmorris	Kilcolman	Claremorris
Curraboy	689	Kilmaine	Robeen	Ballinrobe
Curraboy (Knox)	237	Kilmaine	Ballinrobe	Ballinrobe
Curraboy (or Kilmaine)	117	Kilmaine	Ballinrobe	Ballinrobe
Curragh	114	Carra	Aglish	Castlebar
Curragh	220	Tirawley	Ballynahaglish	Ballina
Curraghaderry	65	Clanmorris	Tagheen	Claremorris
Curraghadooey	721	Clanmorris	Crossboyne	Claremorris
Curraghbaun	37	Kilmaine	Kilmainebeg	Ballinrobe
Curraghboy	141	Erris	Kilmore	Belmullet
Curraghlahan	282	Costello	Knock	Claremorris
Curraghmore	1,068	Tirawley	Addergoole	Castlebar
Curraghmore	160	Carra	Drum	Castlebar
Curraghteemore	193	Costello	Knock	Claremorris
Curramore	200	Kilmaine	Ballinrobe	Ballinrobe
Curranny	85	Carra	Drum	Castlebar
Currantawy	59	Clanmorris	Tagheen	Claremorris
Curraun Boy	2,755	Erris	Kilcommon	Belmullet
Curries	306	Costello	Annagh	Claremorris
Currinah	456	Costello	Kilbeagh	Castlereagh
Curry	115	Carra	Drum	Castlebar
Curry	236	Carra	Breaghwy	Castlebar
Curry (Kirwan)	558	Kilmaine	Mayo	Ballinrobe
Curry (MacManus)	167	Kilmaine	Mayo	Ballinrobe
Curry (MacManus)	202	Clanmorris	Mayo	Ballinrobe
Curryaun	588	Gallen	Kilconduff	Swineford
Currycallaun	123	Carra	Drum	Castlebar
Cushalogurt	158	Burrishoole	Kilmeena	Westport
Cushinkeel	217	Burrishoole	Aghagower	Westport
Cushinsheeaun	280	Burrishoole	Aghagower	Westport
Cushinyen	247	Murrisk	Kilgeever	Westport
Cushlecka	587	Burrishoole	Burrishoole	Newport
Cuslough Demesne	278	Kilmaine	Ballinrobe	Ballinrobe
Dadreen	861	Murrisk	Kilgeever	Westport
Dalgan Demesne	916	Kilmaine	Shrule	Ballinrobe
Dalteen	399	Clanmorris	Kilcolman	Claremorris
Danganmore	389	Gallen	Kildacommoge	Castlebar
Darhanagh	124	Gallen	Killasser	Swineford
Darraragh	320	Erris	Kilcommon	Belmullet
Davillaun	60	Murrisk	Inishbofin	Clifden
Davros	663	Kilmaine	Kilcommon	Ballinrobe
Deelcastle	615	Tirawley	Ardagh	Ballina
Deer Island	1	Carra	Burriscarra	Ballinrobe
Deerpark	329	Burrishoole	Aghagower	Westport
Deerpark	211	Carra	Burriscarra	Ballinrobe
Deerpark	131	Carra	Touaghty	Ballinrobe
Deerpark East	169	Murrisk	Oughaval	Westport
Deerpark Lower	69	Carra	Drum	Castlebar
Deerpark Upper	106	Carra	Drum	Castlebar
Deerpark West	288	Murrisk	Oughaval	Westport
Demesne	182	Carra	Breaghwy	Castlebar
Derradda	193	Burrishoole	Burrishoole	Newport
Derradda	228	Carra	Ballyovey	Ballinrobe
Derradda	147	Costello	Knock	Claremorris
Derragh	156	Costello	Kilmovee	Swineford
Derragh	43	Costello	Knock	Claremorris
Derrakillew	563	Murrisk	Aghagower	Westport
Derrartan	160	Burrishoole	Islandeady	Westport
Derrassa	1,299	Carra	Ballyovey	Ballinrobe
Derrassa Commons	238	Carra	Ballyovey	Ballinrobe
Derreen	103	Carra	Manulla	Castlebar
Derreen	117	Carra	Drum	Castlebar
Derreen	641	Tirawley	Crossmolina	Ballina
Derreen	186	Tirawley	Ardagh	Ballina
Derreen	1,770	Burrishoole	Achill	Newport
Derreenmanus	257	Carra	Aglish	Castlebar
Derreenmulroy	45	Carra	Ballyhean	Castlebar
Derreennanalbanagh	264	Murrisk	Kilgeever	Westport
Derreennascooba	590	Carra	Ballintober	Castlebar
Derreennawinshin	391	Murrisk	Kilgeever	Westport
Derreens	260	Carra	Turlough	Castlebar
Derreens	537	Erris	Kilcommon	Belmullet
Derreens	246	Tirawley	Ballysakeery	Ballina
Derreens	178	Costello	Annagh	Claremorris
Derreens Island	16	Erris	Kilcommon	Belmullet
Derreenyanimna	281	Gallen	Templemore	Castlebar
Derrew	444	Carra	Ballyovey	Ballinrobe
Derrew	198	Carra	Ballintober	Castlebar
Derrew Old	138	Carra	Ballintober	Castlebar
Derrindaffderg	1,366	Carra	Ballintober	Castlebar
Derrindaffderg Commons	187	Carra	Ballintober	Castlebar
Derrinish [Island]	29	Burrishoole	Kilmeena	Westport
Derrinkee	2,211	Murrisk	Aghagower	Westport
Derrinlevaun	116	Carra	Ballyhean	Castlebar
Derrintaggart	154	Burrishoole	Burrishoole	Newport
Derrintin	1,995	Murrisk	Aghagower	Westport
Derrintloura	219	Burrishoole	Islandeady	Westport
Derrintogher	163	Costello	Annagh	Claremorris
Derrinumera	701	Burrishoole	Kilmaclasser	Westport
Derrowel Beg	63	Clanmorris	Mayo	Castlebar
Derrowel More	215	Clanmorris	Mayo	Claremorris
Derry	273	Clanmorris	Knock	Claremorris
Derry	109	Kilmaine	Cong	Ballinrobe
Derry	344	Murrisk	Kilgeever	Westport
Derry	162	Clanmorris	Crossboyne	Claremorris
Derry Lower	1,471	Tirawley	Crossmolina	Ballina
Derry Upper	1,725	Tirawley	Crossmolina	Ballina
Derryadda	86	Carra	Ballyhean	Castlebar
Derryaun	164	Murrisk	Oughaval	Westport
Derrybrack	73	Costello	Aghamore	Swineford
Derrybrock	1,309	Burrishoole	Burrishoole	Newport
Derrycashel	375	Costello	Aghamore	Swineford
Derryclaha	242	Costello	Aghamore	Swineford
Derrycleetagh	97	Burrishoole	Burrishoole	Newport
Derrycontoort East	183	Burrishoole	Burrishoole	Newport
Derrycontoort West	66	Burrishoole	Burrishoole	Newport
Derrycooldrim	519	Burrishoole	Burrishoole	Newport
Derrycooraun	341	Burrishoole	Islandeady	Westport
Derrycoosh	60	Costello	Aghamore	Swineford
Derrycoosh	224	Carra	Aglish	Castlebar
Derrycoosh	513	Carra	Islandeady	Westport
Derrycorrib	692	Erris	Kilcommon	Belmullet
Derrycraff	1,300	Murrisk	Aghagower	Westport
Derrycreeve	186	Burrishoole	Islandeady	Westport
Derrydorneen	226	Costello	Kilbeagh	Swineford
Derrydorragh	27	Carra	Ballyhean	Castlebar
Derryfadda	578	Tirawley	Addergoole	Castlebar
Derryfadda Lower	307	Clanmorris	Tagheen	Claremorris
Derryfadda Upper	256	Clanmorris	Tagheen	Claremorris
Derrygarve	265	Burrishoole	Burrishoole	Newport
Derrygarve	170	Burrishoole	Aghagower	Westport
Derrygarve Beg	304	Murrisk	Kilgeever	Westport
Derrygarve East	24	Carra	Ballyhean	Castlebar
Derrygarve More	304	Murrisk	Kilgeever	Westport
Derrygarve West	304	Carra	Ballyhean	Castlebar
Derrygaury	251	Tirawley	Ballynahaglish	Ballina
Derrygay	437	Costello	Aghamore	Swineford
Derrygorman	824	Murrisk	Aghagower	Westport
Derrygowla	81	Burrishoole	Islandeady	Westport
Derrygullinaun	160	Tirawley	Kilbelfad	Ballina
Derryharriff North	498	Carra	Islandeady	Castlebar
Derryharriff South	429	Carra	Islandeady	Castlebar
Derryhawna	349	Murrisk	Oughaval	Westport
Derryheeagh	512	Murrisk	Kilgeever	Westport
Derryherbert	1,059	Murrisk	Aghagower	Westport
Derryhick	211	Carra	Turlough	Castlebar
Derryhillagh	211	Burrishoole	Burrishoole	Newport
Derryhillagh	1,832	Tirawley	Crossmolina	Ballina
Derryilra	433	Murrisk	Aghagower	Westport
Derrykill East	251	Burrishoole	Burrishoole	Newport
Derrykill West	203	Burrishoole	Burrishoole	Newport
Derrykinlough	560	Costello	Kilbeagh	Swineford
Derrykinlough	504	Gallen	Killedan	Swineford
Derrylahan	278	Costello	Bekan	Claremorris
Derrylahan	267	Carra	Turlough	Castlebar
Derrylahan	100	Murrisk	Kilgeever	Westport
Derrylea	480	Murrisk	Oughaval	Westport
Derrylea	195	Carra	Aglish	Castlebar
Derrylea	118	Burrishoole	Kilmeena	Westport
Derrylea	172	Costello	Annagh	Claremorris
Derryloughan Beg	57	Burrishoole	Burrishoole	Newport
Derryloughan East	916	Burrishoole	Burrishoole	Newport
Derryloughan More	231	Burrishoole	Burrishoole	Newport
Derryloughan North	241	Burrishoole	Burrishoole	Newport
Derryloughan South	301	Burrishoole	Burrishoole	Newport
Derrymannin	173	Tirawley	Ballynahaglish	Ballina
Derrymartin	821	Tirawley	Addergoole	Castlebar
Derrymore	165	Costello	Bekan	Claremorris
Derrymore	216	Carra	Ballyovey	Ballinrobe
Derrymore	329	Kilmaine	Kilcommon	Ballinrobe
Derrymore	604	Murrisk	Oughaval	Westport
Derrynabaunshy	502	Gallen	Attymass	Ballina
Derrynabrock	1,478	Costello	Kilbeagh	Swineford
Derrynacannana	268	Carra	Ballintober	Castlebar
Derrynacong	332	Costello	Annagh	Claremorris
Derrynacross	68	Carra	Turlough	Castlebar
Derrynacross	98	Costello	Kilcolman	Castlereagh
Derrynadivva	889	Carra	Aglish	Castlebar
Derrynagooley	74	Carra	Ballyhean	Castlebar
Derrynagower	211	Clanmorris	Mayo	Claremorris
Derrynagran	178	Tirawley	Ballynahaglish	Ballina
Derrynagur	76	Costello	Kilcolman	Castlereagh
Derrynaleck	285	Costello	Kilmovee	Swineford
Derrynameel	488	Erris	Kilcommon	Belmullet
Derrynamraher	52	Carra	Breaghwy	Castlebar
Derrynamuck	276	Tirawley	Ballynahaglish	Ballina
Derrynamuck	254	Costello	Annagh	Claremorris
Derrynamuck	119	Carra	Turlough	Castlebar
Derrynanaff	59	Burrishoole	Kilmeena	Westport
Derrynanaff	112	Costello	Kilbeagh	Castlereagh
Derrynaned	79	Costello	Aghamore	Swineford
Derrynaraw	142	Burrishoole	Kilmeena	Westport
Derrynarud	24	Costello	Aghamore	Swineford
Derrynashask	36	Carra	Ballyhean	Castlebar
Derrynaskeagh	74	Carra	Ballyhean	Castlebar
Derryool	67	Costello	Knock	Claremorris
Derryool	111	Carra	Ballyhean	Castlebar
Derryool	156	Costello	Aghamore	Swineford
Derryoran	131	Carra	Ballintober	Castlebar
Derryribbeen	599	Burrishoole	Kilmaclasser	Westport
Derryronan	993	Gallen	Kilconduff	Swineford
Derryveeny	1,302	Carra	Ballyovey	Ballinrobe
Derryvicneill	161	Gallen	Attymass	Ballina
Derryvohy	280	Gallen	Killedan	Swineford
Derryvulcaun	421	Carra	Turlough	Castlebar
Dervin	281	Tirawley	Addergoole	Ballina
Devenish Island	7	Kilmaine	Ballinrobe	Ballinrobe
Devleash	125	Gallen	Killedan	Swineford
Devleash East	193	Carra	Ballintober	Castlebar
Devleash West	548	Carra	Ballintober	Castlebar
Devlin	100	Clanmorris	Tagheen	Claremorris
Devlin North	273	Murrisk	Kilgeever	Westport
Devlin South	267	Murrisk	Kilgeever	Westport
Devlis	133	Costello	Bekan	Claremorris
Divish	60	Erris	Kilmore	Belmullet
Donnageaga (or Brownstown)	343	Kilmaine	Robeen	Ballinrobe
Doobehy	1,254	Tirawley	Moygawnagh	Killala
Doocastle (or Ballindoo)	1,956	Costello	Kilturra	Swineford
Dooega	3,761	Burrishoole	Achill	Newport
Doogary	440	Burrishoole	Burrishoole	Newport
Doogary	126	Carra	Breaghwy	Castlebar
Doogary	439	Costello	Aghamore	Swineford
Doogary	74	Costello	Kilcolman	Castlereagh
Doogary	906	Carra	Islandeady	Castlebar
Doogary	100	Costello	Castlemore	Castlereagh
Dooghbeg	1,791	Burrishoole	Burrishoole	Newport
Dooghill	448	Burrishoole	Burrishoole	Newport
Dooghmakeon	1,213	Murrisk	Kilgeever	Westport
Dooghtry	274	Murrisk	Kilgeever	Westport
Doogort	226	Burrishoole	Achill	Newport
Doogort East	2,034	Burrishoole	Achill	Newport
Doogort West	1,659	Burrishoole	Achill	Newport
Doohooma	1,102	Erris	Kilcommon	Belmullet
Dooinkelly (Calvey)	1,935	Burrishoole	Achill	Newport
Dooinkelly (Thulis)	793	Burrishoole	Achill	Newport
Dooleague	249	Burrishoole	Islandeady	Westport
Dooleeg Beg	682	Tirawley	Crossmolina	Ballina
Dooleeg More	1,472	Tirawley	Crossmolina	Ballina
Doolough	2,499	Erris	Kilcommon	Belmullet
Doon	247	Burrishoole	Aghagower	Westport
Doona	1,212	Erris	Kilcommon	Newport
Doonadoba	661	Tirawley	Kilcummin	Killala
Doonamona	146	Tirawley	Templemurry	Killala
Doonanaroo Lower	283	Tirawley	Kilfian	Killala
Doonanaroo Upper	199	Tirawley	Kilfian	Killala
Doonaroya	737	Tirawley	Addergoole	Castlebar
Doonbredia	366	Tirawley	Addergoole	Castlebar
Doonbredia Mountain	278	Tirawley	Addergoole	Castlebar
Doonbristy	1	Tirawley	Kilbride	Killala
Dooncarton (or Glengad)	830	Erris	Kilcommon	Belmullet
Dooncastle	338	Burrishoole	Aghagower	Westport
Dooneen	2	Murrisk	Kilgeever	Westport
Doonfeeny Lower	51	Tirawley	Doonfeeny	Killala
Doonfeeny Upper	635	Tirawley	Doonfeeny	Killala
Dooniver	767	Burrishoole	Achill	Newport
Doonmacreena	138	Clanmorris	Kilvine	Claremorris
Doonmaynor	431	Gallen	Killasser	Swineford
Doonnahinneena	2	Murrisk	Inishbofin	Clifden
Doonnamona	76	Carra	Drum	Castlebar
Doontrusk	471	Burrishoole	Burrishoole	Newport
Doonty	356	Gallen	Killasser	Swineford
Doonvinalla	6	Erris	Kilcommon	Belmullet
Doorath	216	Kilmaine	Kilmainemore	Ballinrobe
Dooreel	1,177	Erris	Kilcommon	Newport
Dooros	76	Clanmorris	Balla	Castlebar
Doovilra	118	Murrisk	Kilgeever	Westport
Dooyork	1,164	Erris	Kilcommon	Belmullet
Dorans Island	5	Kilmaine	Ballinchalla	Ballinrobe
Dorinishmore	9	Burrishoole	Kilmeena	Westport
Dorinshbeg	5	Burrishoole	Kilmeena	Westport
Dowagh East	70	Kilmaine	Cong	Ballinrobe
Dowagh West	165	Kilmaine	Cong	Ballinrobe
Drinaghan	108	Tirawley	Kilfian	Killala
Dringeen Eighter	211	Kilmaine	Cong	Ballinrobe
Dringeen Middle	180	Kilmaine	Cong	Ballinrobe
Dringeen Oughter	329	Kilmaine	Cong	Ballinrobe
Drishaghaun	239	Kilmaine	Mayo	Ballinrobe
Dromada (Duke)	567	Gallen	Killasser	Swineford
Dromada (Gore)	287	Gallen	Killasser	Swineford
Dromada (Joyce)	165	Gallen	Killasser	Swineford
Dromore	236	Carra	Ballintober	Castlebar
Drum	75	Costello	Bekan	Claremorris
Drum	302	Erris	Kilmore	Belmullet
Drum	430	Costello	Knock	Claremorris
Drum (or Knockatemple)	208	Carra	Drum	Castlebar
Drumacappul Island	3	Erris	Kilmore	Belmullet
Drumacoo	621	Costello	Kilcolman	Castlereagh
Drumaderry	358	Costello	Annagh	Claremorris
Drumadoon	206	Carra	Islandeady	Castlebar
Drumadoon	209	Clanmorris	Balla	Castlebar
Drumady	517	Clanmorris	Crossboyne	Claremorris
Drumagh	177	Gallen	Killasser	Swineford
Drumagh	36	Clanmorris	Kilcolman	Claremorris
Drumaleheen	68	Carra	Breaghwy	Castlebar
Drumalooaun	160	Gallen	Killasser	Swineford
Drumanaffrin	1,194	Erris	Kilcommon	Belmullet
Drumard	146	Burrishoole	Kilmeena	Westport
Drumask	80	Carra	Aglish	Castlebar
Drumbaun	306	Costello	Annagh	Claremorris
Drumbrastle East	97	Burrishoole	Burrishoole	Newport
Drumbrastle West	89	Burrishoole	Burrishoole	Newport
Drumcoggy Mountain	875	Carra	Ballyovey	Ballinrobe
Drumconlan	92	Carra	Aglish	Castlebar
Drumcorrabaun	133	Carra	Drum	Castlebar
Drumcorrabaun	175	Carra	Breaghwy	Castlebar
Drumdaff	151	Carra	Turlough	Castlebar
Drumdoogh	156	Carra	Breaghwy	Castlebar
Drumdrishaghaun	149	Carra	Drum	Castlebar
Drumelly	256	Kilmaine	Cong	Ballinrobe
Drumfurban	46	Burrishoole	Burrishoole	Newport
Drumgar	146	Burrishoole	Kilmaclasser	Westport
Drumgarve	168	Burrishoole	Kilmeena	Westport
Drumgollagh	550	Erris	Kilcommon	Newport
Drumgoney	142	Burrishoole	Kilmaclasser	Westport
Drumhuskert	107	Burrishoole	Kilmeena	Westport
Drumilra	894	Burrishoole	Kilmaclasser	Westport
Drumkeaghta	96	Carra	Ballyhean	Castlebar
Drumkeen	178	Clanmorris	Kilcolman	Claremorris
Drumlong	68	Burrishoole	Burrishoole	Newport
Drumloughra	181	Carra	Manulla	Castlebar
Drumloughra	42	Carra	Ballyhean	Castlebar
Drummannaglieve	94	Burrishoole	Burrishoole	Newport
Drummeennavaddoge	50	Carra	Drum	Castlebar
Drummin	245	Tirawley	Ballynahaglish	Ballina
Drummin East	242	Murrisk	Oughaval	Westport
Drummin East	84	Clanmorris	Crossboyne	Claremorris
Drummin North	55	Clanmorris	Crossboyne	Claremorris
Drummin South	48	Clanmorris	Crossboyne	Claremorris
Drummin West	86	Clanmorris	Crossboyne	Claremorris
Drummin West	583	Murrisk	Oughaval	Westport
Drumminabo	287	Burrishoole	Kilmeena	Westport
Drumminaguncan	472	Carra	Islandeady	Castlebar
Drumminahaha	231	Burrishoole	Islandeady	Westport
Drumminaweelaun	36	Murrisk	Oughaval	Westport
Drummindoo	323	Murrisk	Aghagower	Westport
Drummindoo	63	Tirawley	Ardagh	Ballina
Drumminracahill	1	Carra	Breaghwy	Castlebar
Drumminracahill	146	Carra	Ballyhean	Castlebar
Drumminroe East	145	Carra	Ballintober	Castlebar
Drumminroe West	1,104	Carra	Ballintober	Castlebar
Drumminwonagh	319	Burrishoole	Islandeady	Westport
Drumnacarta	53	Carra	Aglish	Castlebar
Drumnalassan	518	Costello	Castlemore	Castlereagh
Drumnanangle	179	Tirawley	Moygawnagh	Killala
Drumnashinnagh	228	Carra	Burriscarra	Ballinrobe
Drumnaslooeen	186	Carra	Manulla	Castlebar
Drumneen	310	Burrishoole	Islandeady	Westport
Drumneen	105	Carra	Aglish	Castlebar
Drumneen	325	Carra	Ballintober	Castlebar
Drumneen	505	Clanmorris	Kilcolman	Claremorris
Drumneen (Prendergast)	144	Clanmorris	Kilcolman	Claremorris
Drumneen Beg	67	Carra	Ballintober	Castlebar
Drumneen More	99	Carra	Ballintober	Castlebar
Drumneen South	104	Clanmorris	Kilcolman	Claremorris
Drumreagh	757	Erris	Kilmore	Belmullet
Drumrevagh	473	Tirawley	Ballynahaglish	Ballina
Drumrud	150	Carra	Touaghty	Ballinrobe
Drumscoba	208	Gallen	Attymass	Ballina
Drumsheel Lower	235	Kilmaine	Cong	Ballinrobe
Drumsheel Upper	120	Kilmaine	Cong	Ballinrobe
Drumsheen	1,513	Gallen	Kilgarvan	Ballina
Drumshinnagh	77	Carra	Aglish	Castlebar
Drumshinnagh	173	Clanmorris	Tagheen	Claremorris
Drumshinnagh	270	Gallen	Kilconduff	Swineford
Drumshinnagh (Lynch)	64	Clanmorris	Tagheen	Claremorris
Drumsleed	1,061	Erris	Kilcommon	Newport
Drunganagh East	241	Carra	Kildacommoge	Castlebar
Drunganagh West	200	Carra	Kildacommoge	Castlebar
Durless	1,092	Murrisk	Oughaval	Westport
Duvillaun More	155	Erris	Kilmore	Belmullet
Duvillaun-beg	24	Erris	Kilmore	Belmullet
Eagle Island	14	Erris	Kilmore	Belmullet
Easter Island	1	Kilmaine	Cong	Ballinrobe
Easter Rock Island	1	Kilmaine	Cong	Ballinrobe
Eden	327	Costello	Knock	Claremorris
Ederglen	861	Erris	Kilcommon	Belmullet
Edmondstown Demesne (or Tullaghanmore)	440	Costello	Kilcolman	Castlereagh
Ellagh-Beg	955	Gallen	Kilgarvan	Ballina
Ellagh-More	896	Gallen	Kilgarvan	Ballina
Ellaghs	282	Tirawley	Kilfian	Killala
Ellistronbeg	343	Kilmaine	Kilmainemore	Ballinrobe
Ellistronparks	76	Kilmaine	Kilmainemore	Ballinrobe
Elly	703	Erris	Kilmore	Belmullet
Elmhall	202	Carra	Drum	Castlebar
Emlagh	375	Murrisk	Kilgeever	Westport
Emlybeg (Kyle)	68	Erris	Kilmore	Belmullet
Emlybeg North	496	Erris	Kilmore	Belmullet
Emlybeg South	463	Erris	Kilmore	Belmullet
Emlycass	214	Erris	Kilmore	Belmullet
Enagh Beg	400	Tirawley	Crossmolina	Ballina
Enagh More	410	Tirawley	Crossmolina	Ballina
Errew	497	Tirawley	Crossmolina	Ballina
Errew	200	Carra	Ballyhean	Castlebar
Erriff	278	Carra	Turlough	Castlebar
Erriff	305	Costello	Bekan	Claremorris
Erriff	2,438	Murrisk	Aghagower	Westport
Esker	71	Clanmorris	Knock	Claremorris
Esker	149	Gallen	Kilconduff	Swineford
Esker	134	Gallen	Meelick	Swineford
Esker East	140	Clanmorris	Crossboyne	Claremorris
Esker North	103	Clanmorris	Crossboyne	Claremorris
Esker South	182	Clanmorris	Crossboyne	Claremorris
Eskeragh	944	Tirawley	Crossmolina	Ballina
Eskerlevalley	236	Clanmorris	Kilcolman	Claremorris
Eskermorilly	204	Clanmorris	Knock	Claremorris
Essaun	727	Erris	Kilcommon	Newport
Facefield	468	Clanmorris	Mayo	Claremorris
Fahburren	696	Murrisk	Oughaval	Westport
Faheens	464	Gallen	Kilconduff	Swineford
Fahy	157	Tirawley	Kilfian	Killala
Fahy	269	Erris	Kilcommon	Newport
Fahy Beg	120	Burrishoole	Kilmaclasser	Westport
Fahy More	92	Burrishoole	Kilmaclasser	Westport
Fahybeg	12	Clanmorris	Mayo	Claremorris
Fairfield Lower	502	Tirawley	Kilfian	Ballina
Fairfield Upper	281	Tirawley	Kilfian	Ballina
Fairhill	109	Burrishoole	Islandeady	Westport
Fallakeeran	213	Clanmorris	Kilvine	Claremorris
Fallataggart	4	Tirawley	Templemurry	Killala
Fallduff	543	Murrisk	Kilgeever	Westport
Falleighter	819	Costello	Aghamore	Swineford
Fallgarve	74	Tirawley	Moygawnagh	Killala
Fallmore	680	Erris	Kilmore	Belmullet
Fallsollus	149	Costello	Kilcolman	Castlereagh
Farmhill	297	Tirawley	Rathreagh	Killala
Farmhill	167	Clanmorris	Crossboyne	Claremorris
Farnaght	389	Murrisk	Oughaval	Westport
Farnaun	317	Costello	Annagh	Claremorris
Farragh	186	Tirawley	Ballysakeery	Ballina
Farrandeelion	238	Tirawley	Ballynahaglish	Ballina
Farrannasculloge	657	Tirawley	Ardagh	Ballina
Farrannoo	316	Tirawley	Kilmoremoy	Ballina
Faughill	189	Costello	Knock	Claremorris
Faulagh	946	Erris	Kilcommon	Belmullet
Fauleens	600	Erris	Kilcommon	Belmullet
Fauleens	543	Costello	Kilbeagh	Swineford
Fauleens	140	Burrishoole	Burrishoole	Newport
Fawnglass	146	Murrisk	Kilgeever	Westport
Fawnmore	194	Murrisk	Inishbofin	Clifden
Feamore	910	Costello	Annagh	Claremorris
Feenune	899	Murrisk	Kilgeever	Westport
Fiddaunnageeroge	1,798	Tirawley	Crossmolina	Ballina
Fisherhill	335	Carra	Turlough	Castlebar
Flag Island	1	Kilmaine	Ballinchalla	Ballinrobe
Flughany	782	Costello	Kilturra	Swineford
Foghill	439	Tirawley	Kilcummin	Killala
Forkfield (or Gowel)	156	Burrishoole	Aghagower	Westport
Formoyle	454	Tirawley	Moygawnagh	Killala
Formoyle	1,795	Murrisk	Kilgeever	Westport
Forrew	710	Tirawley	Moygawnagh	Killala
Forthill	159	Costello	Bekan	Claremorris
Fortland	189	Tirawley	Kilfian	Ballina
Fortlawn	46	Carra	Drum	Castlebar
Fotish	274	Tirawley	Crossmolina	Ballina
Fountainhill	207	Kilmaine	Kilmainebeg	Ballinrobe
**Foxford**	Town	Gallen	Toomore	Swineford
Foxford	1,019	Gallen	Toomore	Swineford
Frasnadeffa	121	Costello	Kilcolman	Castlereagh
Freaghillan	19	Burrishoole	Kilmeena	Westport
Freaghillan	4	Tirawley	Ballysakeery	Ballina
Freaghillan	6	Carra	Turlough	Castlebar
Freaghillan West	3	Burrishoole	Burrishoole	Newport
Freaghillanluggagh	3	Burrishoole	Burrishoole	Newport
Freeheen	135	Tirawley	Crossmolina	Ballina
Freeheen	172	Clanmorris	Mayo	Ballinrobe
Frenchbrook North	221	Kilmaine	Kilmainemore	Ballinrobe
Frenchbrook South	575	Kilmaine	Kilmainemore	Ballinrobe
Frenchgrove	668	Kilmaine	Kilcommon	Ballinrobe
Friarsground	16	Costello	Annagh	Claremorris
Friarshill	26	Costello	Castlemore	Castlereagh
Friarsquarter East	220	Kilmaine	Ballinrobe	Ballinrobe
Friarsquarter West	241	Kilmaine	Ballinrobe	Ballinrobe
Friarstown	257	Tirawley	Kilbelfad	Ballina
Funshinagh	361	Kilmaine	Cong	Ballinrobe
Furgill	439	Murrisk	Oughaval	Westport
Furnace	220	Carra	Ballyovey	Ballinrobe
Furnace	242	Burrishoole	Burrishoole	Newport
Gaghta Island	4	Erris	Kilmore	Belmullet
Gallagh	178	Carra	Ballyovey	Ballinrobe
Gallgort	74	Carra	Burriscarra	Ballinrobe
Garhawnagh	181	Clanmorris	Balla	Castlebar
Garracloon	133	Kilmaine	Cong	Ballinrobe
Garraghill	517	Carra	Turlough	Castlebar
Garranard	230	Tirawley	Moygawnagh	Killala
Garrankeel	135	Tirawley	Kilmoremoy	Ballina
Garranty	301	Murrisk	Kilgeever	Westport
Garraun	216	Tirawley	Crossmolina	Ballina
Garraun	237	Costello	Annagh	Claremorris
Garraun	82	Kilmaine	Moorgagagh	Ballinrobe
Garraunard	169	Tirawley	Crossmolina	Ballina
Garravlagh	299	Clanmorris	Tagheen	Claremorris
Garreens	202	Kilmaine	Kilcommon	Ballinrobe
Garrow	92	Burrishoole	Aghagower	Westport
Garrycloonagh	173	Tirawley	Kilbelfad	Ballina
Garryduff	182	Carra	Aglish	Castlebar
Garryduff Middle	75	Clanmorris	Crossboyne	Claremorris
Garryduff North	87	Clanmorris	Crossboyne	Claremorris
Garryduff South	124	Clanmorris	Crossboyne	Claremorris
Garryduff West	175	Clanmorris	Crossboyne	Claremorris
Garrymore	663	Kilmaine	Kilcommon	Claremorris
Garrynabba	78	Clanmorris	Kilcolman	Claremorris
Garrynagran	251	Tirawley	Moygawnagh	Killala
Garryredmond	624	Clanmorris	Kilcolman	Claremorris
Garryroe	92	Gallen	Killedan	Swineford
Garrywadreen	287	Clanmorris	Kilcolman	Claremorris
Garterhill	671	Erris	Kilcommon	Belmullet
Geevraun	762	Tirawley	Doonfeeny	Killala
Gladree	554	Erris	Kilmore	Belmullet
Glasgort	307	Carra	Ballintober	Castlebar
Glasheens	781	Tirawley	Crossmolina	Ballina
Glasmansally	28	Carra	Burriscarra	Castlebar
Glaspatrick	823	Murrisk	Oughaval	Westport
Glassillan	25	Erris	Kilcommon	Newport
Glassillan Island	1	Erris	Kilcommon	Newport
Glastrasna	390	Costello	Kilbeagh	Swineford
Glasvally	143	Kilmaine	Shrule	Ballinrobe
Glebe	62	Costello	Castlemore	Castlereagh
Glebe	31	Tirawley	Kilbelfad	Ballina
Glebe	36	Carra	Drum	Castlebar
Glebe	61	Tirawley	Crossmolina	Ballina
Glebe	41	Kilmaine	Cong	Ballinrobe
Glebe	47	Tirawley	Lackan	Killala
Glebe	67	Erris	Kilmore	Belmullet
Glebe	47	Murrisk	Kilgeever	Westport
Glen	491	Murrisk	Kilgeever	Westport
Glenagh	1,200	Tirawley	Doonfeeny	Killala
Glenagort	645	Tirawley	Crossmolina	Ballina
Glenavenew	137	Tirawley	Addergoole	Castlebar
Glenbaun	338	Murrisk	Oughaval	Westport
Glencally	511	Murrisk	Oughaval	Westport
Glencalry Lower	784	Tirawley	Doonfeeny	Killala
Glencalry Upper	1,151	Tirawley	Doonfeeny	Killala
Glencastle	2,336	Erris	Kilcommon	Belmullet
Glenconnelly	1,672	Murrisk	Kilgeever	Westport
Glencullin	2,086	Murrisk	Kilgeever	Westport
Glencullin	1,000	Tirawley	Doonfeeny	Killala
Glencullin Lower	2,068	Erris	Kilcommon	Belmullet
Glencullin Upper	2,780	Erris	Kilcommon	Belmullet
Glendaduff	747	Gallen	Attymass	Ballina
Glendahurk	1,455	Burrishoole	Burrishoole	Newport
Glendavock	1,743	Murrisk	Aghagower	Westport
Glendavoolagh	2,024	Tirawley	Crossmolina	Ballina
Glendorragha	1,874	Tirawley	Addergoole	Castlebar
Glenedagh Eighter	433	Tirawley	Kilfian	Killala
Glenedagh Oughter	1,071	Tirawley	Kilfian	Killala
Glengad (or Dooncarton)	830	Erris	Kilcommon	Belmullet
Glenglassera	1,191	Tirawley	Doonfeeny	Killala
Glenkeen	3,667	Murrisk	Kilgeever	Westport
Glenlara	1,822	Erris	Kilmore	Belmullet
Glenlara	1,302	Burrishoole	Burrishoole	Newport
Glenlaur	1,138	Murrisk	Oughaval	Westport
Glenmask	1,872	Carra	Ballyovey	Ballinrobe
Glenmullynaha East	871	Costello	Kilbeagh	Swineford
Glenmullynaha West	945	Costello	Kilbeagh	Swineford
Glennacally	5,247	Murrisk	Aghagower	Westport
Glennagashleeny	969	Carra	Ballyovey	Ballinrobe
Glennamaddoo	2,045	Burrishoole	Burrishoole	Newport
Glennamong	4,453	Burrishoole	Burrishoole	Newport
Glenora	781	Tirawley	Doonfeeny	Killala
Glentavraun	1,578	Costello	Kilmovee	Swineford
Glenthomas	1,129	Burrishoole	Burrishoole	Newport
Glenturk Beg	1,823	Erris	Kilcommon	Belmullet
Glenturk More	1,547	Erris	Kilcommon	Belmullet
Glenulra	2,164	Tirawley	Doonfeeny	Killala
Glenummera	2,866	Murrisk	Aghagower	Westport
Glenummera	524	Murrisk	Kilgeever	Westport
Glinsk	505	Murrisk	Aghagower	Westport
Glinsk	2,054	Erris	Kilcommon	Belmullet
Gneeve	274	Carra	Kildacommoge	Castlebar
Goolamore	254	Erris	Kilcommon	Belmullet
Goose Island	9	Tirawley	Ballysakeery	Ballina
Gort	463	Carra	Turlough	Castlebar
Gortacurra	253	Kilmaine	Cong	Ballinrobe
Gortalavaun	39	Clanmorris	Tagheen	Claremorris
Gortaneden	189	Tirawley	Crossmolina	Ballina
Gortaneden	789	Erris	Kilmore	Belmullet
Gortanierin	108	Clanmorris	Crossboyne	Claremorris
Gortanure	564	Costello	Kilbeagh	Castlereagh
Gortaphuill	230	Carra	Rosslee	Castlebar
Gortaphuntaun	149	Clanmorris	Mayo	Claremorris
Gortaroe	114	Murrisk	Oughaval	Westport
Gortaroe	59	Kilmaine	Cong	Ballinrobe
Gortaruaun	56	Carra	Drum	Castlebar
Gortaskibbole	464	Tirawley	Ballynahaglish	Ballina
Gortatober	171	Kilmaine	Shrule	Ballinrobe
Gortatoger	328	Tirawley	Ardagh	Ballina
Gortatoor	191	Tirawley	Lackan	Killala
Gortawarla	196	Burrishoole	Kilmeena	Newport
Gortbaun	380	Carra	Ballintober	Castlebar
Gortbrack	332	Kilmaine	Shrule	Ballinrobe
Gortbrack	249	Erris	Kilmore	Belmullet
Gortbrack North	1,070	Erris	Kilcommon	Belmullet
Gortbrack South	1,114	Erris	Kilcommon	Newport
Gortbunacullin	1,204	Carra	Ballyovey	Ballinrobe
Gorteen	121	Burrishoole	Aghagower	Westport
Gorteen	335	Costello	Annagh	Claremorris
Gorteen	145	Burrishoole	Kilmaclasser	Westport
Gorteen	241	Gallen	Templemore	Castlebar
Gorteen	314	Tirawley	Kilmoremoy	Ballina
Gorteen Beg	83	Costello	Bekan	Claremorris
Gorteen More	159	Costello	Bekan	Claremorris
Gorteendarragh	12	Murrisk	Oughaval	Westport
Gorteendrunagh	243	Carra	Aglish	Castlebar
Gorteenlynagh	126	Kilmaine	Ballinrobe	Ballinrobe
Gorteenmore	140	Carra	Ballyovey	Ballinrobe
Gorteenmore	291	Clanmorris	Kilcolman	Claremorris
Gorteennamuck	201	Tirawley	Ballynahaglish	Ballina
Gorteenroe	101	Kilmaine	Cong	Ballinrobe
Gorteens	372	Kilmaine	Moorgagagh	Ballinrobe
Gortfadda	52	Clanmorris	Kilcolman	Claremorris
Gortfahy	164	Burrishoole	Burrishoole	Newport
Gortfree	284	Carra	Ballyovey	Ballinrobe
Gortgarve	154	Gallen	Killedan	Swineford
Gortgarve	24	Clanmorris	Crossboyne	Claremorris
Gortjordan	124	Kilmaine	Kilmainebeg	Ballinrobe
Gortlahan	248	Carra	Kildacommoge	Castlebar
Gortleatilla	2,023	Erris	Kilcommon	Belmullet
Gortmellia	1,236	Erris	Kilcommon	Belmullet
Gortmore	769	Erris	Kilcommon	Belmullet
Gortnaclassagh	499	Burrishoole	Kilmaclasser	Westport
Gortnadrehy	294	Tirawley	Ballynahaglish	Ballina
Gortnafolla	426	Carra	Turlough	Castlebar
Gortnageeragh	190	Costello	Annagh	Claremorris
Gortnagranagher	31	Clanmorris	Tagheen	Claremorris
Gortnagusetaul	32	Clanmorris	Mayo	Claremorris
Gortnaheltia	1,423	Tirawley	Addergoole	Castlebar
Gortnahurra Lower	1,901	Tirawley	Crossmolina	Ballina
Gortnahurra Upper	585	Tirawley	Crossmolina	Ballina
Gortnalyer	43	Tirawley	Crossmolina	Ballina
Gortnaraby	212	Tirawley	Crossmolina	Ballina
Gortnaraha	455	Clanmorris	Kilcolman	Claremorris
Gortnashammer	128	Kilmaine	Kilcommon	Ballinrobe
Gortnasillagh	196	Gallen	Bohola	Swineford
Gortnaskohoge	103	Kilmaine	Kilmainebeg	Ballinrobe
Gortnasmuttaun	155	Carra	Ballyhean	Castlebar
Gortnastang	65	Kilmaine	Kilmainemore	Ballinrobe
Gortskeddia	230	Tirawley	Crossmolina	Ballina
Gortskehy	226	Kilmaine	Kilcommon	Claremorris
Goulaun	661	Tirawley	Crossmolina	Ballina
Gowel	206	Clanmorris	Mayo	Claremorris
Gowel	322	Costello	Kilbeagh	Swineford
Gowel (or Forkfield)	156	Burrishoole	Aghagower	Westport
Gowelboy	210	Gallen	Killedan	Swineford
Gowlaun	607	Costello	Kilmovee	Swineford
Gowlaun	957	Costello	Kilbeagh	Swineford
Graddoge	131	Carra	Rosslee	Ballinrobe
Graffa Beg	135	Carra	Islandeady	Castlebar
Graffa More	478	Carra	Islandeady	Castlebar
Graffy	1,293	Gallen	Kilgarvan	Ballina
Graffy	358	Gallen	Killasser	Swineford
Graffy	175	Carra	Kildacommoge	Castlebar
Graffy	297	Burrishoole	Burrishoole	Newport
Graghil	468	Erris	Kilcommon	Belmullet
Grallagh	24	Clanmorris	Tagheen	Claremorris
Grallagh	460	Gallen	Kildacommoge	Castlebar
Grallagh	612	Costello	Annagh	Claremorris
Grallaghgarden	29	Costello	Bekan	Claremorris
Grange	608	Tirawley	Crossmolina	Ballina
Greaghaus	281	Kilmaine	Kilcommon	Ballinrobe
Green Island	2	Kilmaine	Cong	Ballinrobe
Greenan	58	Clanmorris	Crossboyne	Claremorris
Greenans	1,002	Carra	Turlough	Castlebar
Greenaun	2,240	Erris	Kilcommon	Newport
Greenaun	287	Tirawley	Ardagh	Ballina
Greenwood	278	Costello	Bekan	Claremorris
Greenwoodpark	270	Tirawley	Kilfian	Ballina
Greyfield (or Clylea)	92	Kilmaine	Kilmainemore	Ballinrobe
Griffins Island	1	Tirawley	Ballynahaglish	Ballina
Guardhousepark	66	Clanmorris	Crossboyne	Claremorris
Gubalennaun-beg	2	Burrishoole	Achill	Newport
Gubnahardia	159	Burrishoole	Achill	Newport
Gurraunard	162	Gallen	Templemore	Castlebar
Gweesalia	997	Erris	Kilcommon	Belmullet
Gweeshadan	214	Carra	Drum	Castlebar
Hagfield (or Treanacally)	860	Costello	Kilbeagh	Swineford
Harefield	217	Clanmorris	Mayo	Claremorris
Hawksford	456	Costello	Kilcolman	Castlereagh
Hawthornlodge	143	Carra	Breaghwy	Castlebar
Hazelhill	449	Costello	Annagh	Claremorris
Heath	554	Clanmorris	Crossboyne	Claremorris
Heath island	1	Burrishoole	Achill	Newport
Heathlawn	182	Clanmorris	Mayo	Castlebar
Hog Island	2	Carra	Burriscarra	Ballinrobe
Hollowpark	167	Carra	Rosslee	Castlebar
**Hollymount**	Town	Kilmaine	Kilcommon	Ballinrobe
Hollymount Demesne	403	Kilmaine	Kilcommon	Ballinrobe
Holy Island (or Camillaun)	4	Kilmaine	Cong	Ballinrobe
Holywell Lower	233	Costello	Annagh	Claremorris
Holywell Upper	150	Costello	Annagh	Claremorris
Horse Island	3	Carra	Burriscarra	Ballinrobe
Horse Island	8	Tirawley	Doonfeeny	Killala
Houndswood Middle	426	Kilmaine	Cong	Ballinrobe
Houndswood North	377	Kilmaine	Cong	Ballinrobe
Houndswood South	316	Kilmaine	Cong	Ballinrobe
Hundred Acres	186	Kilmaine	Kilmainebeg	Ballinrobe
Illan Boebeg	3	Kilmaine	Ballinchalla	Ballinrobe
Illan Boemore	8	Kilmaine	Ballinchalla	Ballinrobe
Illan Columbkille	1	Carra	Ballyovey	Ballinrobe
Illanataggart	29	Burrishoole	Kilmeena	Westport
Illanatrim	1	Kilmaine	Robeen	Ballinrobe
Illancroagh	5	Erris	Kilcommon	Newport
Illandavuck	6	Erris	Kilmore	Belmullet
Illandawaur	3	Carra	Ballyovey	Ballinrobe
Illanee	1	Carra	Turlough	Castlebar
Illangub	1	Carra	Turlough	Castlebar
Illanmaster	6	Erris	Kilcommon	Belmullet
Illanmaw	1	Burrishoole	Kilmeena	Westport
Illanmore	211	Kilmaine	Kilmainebeg	Ballinrobe
Illannacooney	2	Burrishoole	Kilmeena	Westport
Illannaglashy	81	Tirawley	Kilbelfad	Ballina
Illannambraher East	14	Burrishoole	Burrishoole	Newport
Illannambraher West	11	Burrishoole	Burrishoole	Newport
Illannamona	4	Burrishoole	Kilmeena	Westport
Illanneill	1	Carra	Turlough	Castlebar
Illanoon	2	Burrishoole	Burrishoole	Newport
Illanroe	2	Burrishoole	Burrishoole	Newport
Illanroe	2	Erris	Kilcommon	Newport
Illanroe	2	Murrisk	Oughaval	Westport
Illanteige East	38	Burrishoole	Islandeady	Westport
Illanteige West	21	Burrishoole	Islandeady	Westport
Illanulque	1	Carra	Turlough	Castlebar
Inagh	1,235	Tirawley	Doonfeeny	Killala
Inchcorty	1	Burrishoole	Burrishoole	Newport
Inishacrick	5	Burrishoole	Burrishoole	Newport
Inishaghoo	14	Erris	Kilcommon	Newport
Inishangan (or Shangorman)	16	Kilmaine	Ballinrobe	Ballinrobe
Inishard	209	Kilmaine	Ballinchalla	Ballinrobe
Inishbee	38	Burrishoole	Kilmeena	Westport
Inishbiggle	637	Erris	Kilcommon	Newport
Inishbobunnan	24	Burrishoole	Burrishoole	Newport
Inishbollog	3	Burrishoole	Kilmeena	Newport
Inishcannon	3	Burrishoole	Burrishoole	Newport
Inishcoe	115	Tirawley	Crossmolina	Ballina
Inishcooa	20	Burrishoole	Burrishoole	Newport
Inishcoog	64	Kilmaine	Ballinchalla	Ballinrobe
Inishcoragh	8	Burrishoole	Burrishoole	Newport
Inishcottle	23	Burrishoole	Kilmeena	Westport
Inishcuill East	14	Burrishoole	Kilmeena	Newport
Inishcuill West	2	Burrishoole	Kilmeena	Newport
Inishdaff	32	Burrishoole	Kilmeena	Newport
Inishdalla	15	Murrisk	Kilgeever	Westport
Inishdasky	15	Burrishoole	Burrishoole	Newport
Inishdaugh	6	Murrisk	Oughaval	Westport
Inishdaweel	15	Burrishoole	Burrishoole	Newport
Inishdeashmore	6	Burrishoole	Burrishoole	Newport
Inishdegilbeg	1	Murrisk	Kilgeever	Westport
Inishdegilmore	32	Murrisk	Kilgeever	Westport
Inishderry	3	Erris	Kilcommon	Belmullet
Inishdoonver	12	Burrishoole	Burrishoole	Newport
Inishdugh	8	Tirawley	Ballysakeery	Ballina
Inishdurra	12	Kilmaine	Ballinrobe	Ballinrobe
Inisheeny	25	Murrisk	Oughaval	Westport
Inisherkin	30	Burrishoole	Burrishoole	Newport
Inishfesh	12	Burrishoole	Kilmeena	Newport
Inishgalloon	13	Burrishoole	Achill	Newport
Inishgleasty	15	Kilmaine	Cong	Ballinrobe
Inishglora	37	Erris	Kilmore	Belmullet
Inishgort	27	Burrishoole	Kilmeena	Westport
Inishgort	34	Murrisk	Inishbofin	Clifden
Inishgowla	31	Burrishoole	Burrishoole	Newport
Inishgowla	32	Burrishoole	Kilmeena	Westport
Inishgowla South	28	Burrishoole	Kilmeena	Westport
Inishilra	8	Burrishoole	Burrishoole	Newport
Inishimmel	3	Burrishoole	Kilmeena	Westport
Inishkea North	464	Erris	Kilmore	Belmullet
Inishkea South	344	Erris	Kilmore	Belmullet
Inishkee	12	Burrishoole	Burrishoole	Newport
Inishkeel	30	Burrishoole	Burrishoole	Newport
Inishkeeragh North	8	Erris	Kilmore	Belmullet
Inishkeeragh South	16	Erris	Kilmore	Belmullet
Inishlaghan	1	Burrishoole	Kilmeena	Westport
Inishlaughil	28	Burrishoole	Kilmeena	Westport
Inishleague	13	Burrishoole	Kilmeena	Westport
Inishlee	1	Tirawley	Kilbelfad	Ballina
Inishlim	6	Burrishoole	Burrishoole	Newport
Inishloy	21	Burrishoole	Kilmeena	Newport
Inishlyon	74	Murrisk	Inishbofin	Clifden
Inishlyre	52	Burrishoole	Kilmeena	Westport
Inishmaine	165	Kilmaine	Ballinchalla	Ballinrobe
Inishmolt	4	Burrishoole	Kilmeena	Newport
Inishnacross	25	Burrishoole	Burrishoole	Newport
Inishnakillew	58	Burrishoole	Kilmeena	Westport
Inishoght	13	Kilmaine	Ballinchalla	Ballinrobe
Inishoo	17	Burrishoole	Kilmeena	Westport
Inishowel	5	Kilmaine	Ballinchalla	Ballinrobe
Inishowen	29	Kilmaine	Ballinchalla	Ballinrobe
Inishower	36	Burrishoole	Burrishoole	Newport
Inishquirk	28	Burrishoole	Burrishoole	Newport
Inishraher	26	Burrishoole	Kilmeena	Westport
Inishrobe	21	Kilmaine	Ballinrobe	Ballinrobe
Inishshark	581	Murrisk	Inishbofin	Clifden
Inishskinnybeg	4	Murrisk	Inishbofin	Clifden
Inishskinnymore	12	Murrisk	Inishbofin	Clifden
Inishtubbrid	37	Burrishoole	Burrishoole	Newport
Inishturk	59	Burrishoole	Kilmeena	Westport
Inishturlin	20	Burrishoole	Burrishoole	Newport
Intake	55	Burrishoole	Kilmeena	Westport
Inver	662	Erris	Kilcommon	Belmullet
Ishlaun	368	Costello	Castlemore	Castlereagh
Island	842	Costello	Bekan	Claremorris
Island More	77	Burrishoole	Kilmeena	Westport
Island Morris	6	Kilmaine	Cong	Ballinrobe
Islandeady	20	Burrishoole	Islandeady	Westport
Islandmore	5	Tirawley	Addergoole	Castlebar
Islandmore	264	Costello	Kilcolman	Castlereagh
Islandmore	187	Tirawley	Addergoole	Castlebar
Johnsfort	158	Gallen	Kilconduff	Swineford
Keebagh	84	Costello	Bekan	Claremorris
Keel East	1,644	Burrishoole	Achill	Newport
Keel West	4,071	Burrishoole	Achill	Newport
Keelkill	169	Carra	Breaghwy	Castlebar
Keelkill	644	Murrisk	Aghagower	Westport
**Keeloges**	Town	Carra	Kildacommoge	Castlebar
Keeloges	292	Burrishoole	Islandeady	Westport
Keeloges	122	Burrishoole	Burrishoole	Newport
Keeloges Lower	29	Tirawley	Lackan	Killala
Keeloges New	297	Carra	Kildacommoge	Castlebar
Keeloges Old	337	Carra	Kildacommoge	Castlebar
Keeloges Upper	32	Tirawley	Lackan	Killala
Keenagh Beg	1,778	Tirawley	Crossmolina	Ballina
Keenagh More	1,922	Tirawley	Crossmolina	Ballina
Keerglen	1,768	Tirawley	Kilfian	Killala
Kid Island	25	Erris	Kilcommon	Belmullet
Kid Island	4	Carra	Ballyovey	Ballinrobe
Kilbeg (Malone)	203	Clanmorris	Kilcolman	Claremorris
Kilbree Lower	404	Burrishoole	Ballintober	Westport
Kilbree Upper	325	Burrishoole	Ballintober	Westport
Kilbrenan	90	Carra	Drum	Castlebar
Kilbride	817	Tirawley	Kilbride	Killala
Kilbride	250	Clanmorris	Mayo	Claremorris
Kilbride	631	Gallen	Kilconduff	Swineford
Kilbride	225	Burrishoole	Burrishoole	Newport
Kilcashel	265	Costello	Kilmovee	Swineford
Kilcolman	354	Clanmorris	Kilcolman	Claremorris
Kilcolman	171	Costello	Kilcolman	Castlereagh
Kilcommon	115	Kilmaine	Kilcommon	Ballinrobe
Kilcommon (or Pollatomish)	672	Erris	Kilcommon	Belmullet
Kilcummin	186	Tirawley	Kilcummin	Killala
Kildaree	117	Tirawley	Crossmolina	Ballina
Kildarra	104	Costello	Annagh	Claremorris
Kildavaroge	245	Tirawley	Crossmolina	Ballina
Kildermot	139	Gallen	Attymass	Ballina
Kildotia	93	Kilmaine	Kilmolara	Ballinrobe
Kildun	308	Erris	Kilcommon	Newport
Kildun Beg	285	Kilmaine	Cong	Ballinrobe
Kildun More	289	Kilmaine	Cong	Ballinrobe
Kilfaul	379	Carra	Ballyovey	Ballinrobe
Kilfea	181	Burrishoole	Islandeady	Westport
Kilgalligan	832	Erris	Kilcommon	Belmullet
Kilgarriff	788	Costello	Kilbeagh	Swineford
Kilgarriff	403	Costello	Aghamore	Claremorris
Kilgarriff West	1,139	Costello	Kilbeagh	Swineford
Kilgarvan	820	Gallen	Kilgarvan	Ballina
Kilgarve	714	Carra	Islandeady	Castlebar
Kilgeever	546	Murrisk	Kilgeever	Westport
Kilgellia	518	Gallen	Attymass	Ballina
Kilglassan	281	Kilmaine	Kilcommon	Ballinrobe
Kilgobban	73	Tirawley	Killala	Killala
Kilgreana	244	Kilmaine	Mayo	Ballinrobe
Kilhale	830	Carra	Islandeady	Castlebar
Kilkeeran	246	Kilmaine	Ballinrobe	Ballinrobe
Kilkeeran	241	Costello	Castlemore	Castlereagh
Kilkeeran	309	Kilmaine	Kilmainebeg	Ballinrobe
Kilkeeran	373	Carra	Ballyovey	Ballinrobe
**Kilkelly**	Town	Costello	Kilmovee	Swineford
Kilkelly	46	Costello	Kilmovee	Swineford
Kilkenny	91	Carra	Breaghwy	Castlebar
Kilknock	246	Carra	Breaghwy	Castlebar
Kilknock	315	Costello	Bekan	Claremorris
Kill	193	Kilmaine	Moorgagagh	Ballinrobe
Kill	430	Murrisk	Kilgeever	Westport
Killaclare	252	Costello	Kilmovee	Swineford
Killacorraun	1,282	Tirawley	Crossmolina	Ballina
Killadangan	218	Murrisk	Oughaval	Westport
Killadangan	220	Costello	Castlemore	Castlereagh
Killadeer	870	Carra	Ballyhean	Castlebar
Killadeer	720	Carra	Ballintober	Castlebar
Killadoon	438	Murrisk	Kilgeever	Westport
Killaghoor	264	Murrisk	Oughaval	Westport
Killaghwaun	85	Carra	Islandeady	Castlebar
**Killala**	Town	Tirawley	Killala	Killala
Killala	392	Tirawley	Killala	Killala
Killard	84	Carra	Turlough	Castlebar
Killaturly	856	Costello	Kilbeagh	Swineford
Killavally East	453	Carra	Ballintober	Castlebar
Killavally West	552	Carra	Ballintober	Castlebar
Killawullaun East	331	Carra	Ballintober	Castlebar
Killawullaun Mountain	331	Carra	Ballintober	Castlebar
Killawullaun West	329	Carra	Ballintober	Castlebar
Killedan	455	Gallen	Killedan	Swineford
Killeen	216	Gallen	Meelick	Swineford
Killeen	51	Gallen	Killasser	Swineford
Killeen	340	Costello	Kilbeagh	Swineford
Killeen	55	Clanmorris	Knock	Claremorris
Killeen	124	Carra	Drum	Castlebar
Killeen	196	Tirawley	Kilbride	Killala
Killeen	364	Tirawley	Crossmolina	Ballina
Killeen	315	Gallen	Kildacommoge	Castlebar
Killeen	155	Costello	Aghamore	Swineford
Killeen	356	Clanmorris	Crossboyne	Claremorris
Killeena	315	Tirawley	Doonfeeny	Killala
Killeencoff	223	Murrisk	Oughaval	Westport
Killeennashask	103	Tirawley	Moygawnagh	Killala
Killeenrevagh	278	Kilmaine	Kilcommon	Claremorris
Killeenrevagh	505	Clanmorris	Crossboyne	Claremorris
Killencreevagh	15	Tirawley	Rathreagh	Killala
Killerduff	304	Tirawley	Doonfeeny	Killala
Killernan	531	Kilmaine	Kilmainemore	Ballinrobe
Killimor	747	Kilmaine	Ballinchalla	Ballinrobe
Killogeary	192	Tirawley	Lackan	Killala
Killogunra	98	Tirawley	Killala	Killala
Killosheheen	249	Kilmaine	Ballinrobe	Ballinrobe
Killour	239	Kilmaine	Ballinchalla	Ballinrobe
Killoveeny	391	Costello	Knock	Claremorris
Killunagher	555	Costello	Annagh	Claremorris
Killybrone	101	Tirawley	Killala	Killala
Killylea	102	Costello	Bekan	Claremorris
Kilmacanelly	88	Clanmorris	Crossboyne	Claremorris
Kilmacduagh	172	Kilmaine	Kilmainebeg	Ballinrobe
Kilmacrade	213	Carra	Breaghwy	Castlebar
**Kilmaine**	Town	Kilmaine	Kilmainemore	Ballinrobe
Kilmaine	35	Kilmaine	Kilmainemore	Ballinrobe
Kilmainepark	80	Kilmaine	Kilmainemore	Ballinrobe
Kilmannin	127	Costello	Bekan	Claremorris
Kilmeena	141	Burrishoole	Kilmeena	Westport
Kilmore	866	Costello	Kilmovee	Swineford
Kilmore	550	Gallen	Toomore	Swineford
Kilmoremoy	139	Tirawley	Kilmoremoy	Ballina
Kilmovee	240	Costello	Kilmovee	Swineford
Kilmurry Beg	102	Tirawley	Crossmolina	Ballina
Kilmurry More	129	Tirawley	Crossmolina	Ballina
Kilnageer	163	Carra	Drum	Castlebar
Kilnagower	179	Clanmorris	Kilcolman	Claremorris
Kilquire Lower	331	Kilmaine	Kilmainemore	Ballinrobe
Kilquire Upper	195	Kilmaine	Kilmainemore	Ballinrobe
Kilroe	104	Tirawley	Killala	Killala
Kilrush	165	Kilmaine	Kilcommon	Ballinrobe
Kilsallagh	1,307	Erris	Kilcommon	Belmullet
Kilsallagh Lower	702	Murrisk	Oughaval	Westport
Kilsallagh Upper	347	Murrisk	Oughaval	Westport
Kilscohagh	318	Clanmorris	Crossboyne	Claremorris
Kilskeagh	115	Carra	Touaghty	Ballinrobe
**Kiltamagh**	Town	Gallen	Killedan	Swineford
Kiltamagh	267	Gallen	Killedan	Swineford
Kiltarnaght	136	Burrishoole	Burrishoole	Newport
Kiltarsaghaun	840	Carra	Ballintober	Castlebar
Kiltaugharaun	168	Kilmaine	Robeen	Ballinrobe
Kilteany	266	Erris	Kilcommon	Belmullet
Kiltogorra	305	Kilmaine	Cong	Ballinrobe
Kiltrone	545	Kilmaine	Robeen	Ballinrobe
Kiltybo	226	Costello	Annagh	Claremorris
Kiltyroe	199	Burrishoole	Kilmeena	Newport
Kilvanloon	199	Costello	Castlemore	Castlereagh
Kilvindoney	339	Kilmaine	Robeen	Ballinrobe
**Kilvine**	Town	Clanmorris	Kilvine	Claremorris
Kilvine	990	Clanmorris	Kilvine	Claremorris
Kinaff	594	Gallen	Kilconduff	Swineford
Kinard	218	Tirawley	Crossmolina	Ballina
Kinatevdilla	6	Murrisk	Kilgeever	Westport
**Kincon**	Town	Tirawley	Kilfian	Killala
Kincon	614	Costello	Knock	Claremorris
Kincon	498	Tirawley	Kilfian	Killala
Kinknock	279	Murrisk	Kilgeever	Westport
Kinlough	515	Kilmaine	Shrule	Ballinrobe
Kinnadoohy	525	Murrisk	Kilgeever	Westport
Kinnakillew	2,020	Murrisk	Kilgeever	Westport
Kinnavally	167	Tirawley	Kilfian	Killala
Kinnewry	1,035	Carra	Ballintober	Castlebar
Kinturk Lower	119	Carra	Ballyhean	Castlebar
Kinturk Upper	28	Carra	Ballyhean	Castlebar
Knappagh Beg	699	Murrisk	Aghagower	Westport
Knappagh More	434	Murrisk	Aghagower	Westport
Knappaghmanagh	494	Murrisk	Aghagower	Westport
Knock	366	Murrisk	Inishbofin	Clifden
Knock North	274	Kilmaine	Cong	Ballinrobe
Knock South	74	Kilmaine	Cong	Ballinrobe
Knockacroghery	151	Carra	Aglish	Castlebar
Knockaculleen	172	Tirawley	Moygawnagh	Killala
Knockacurreen	47	Carra	Burriscarra	Ballinrobe
Knockadangan	121	Tirawley	Crossmolina	Ballina
Knockadoon	522	Clanmorris	Kilvine	Claremorris
Knockadoon	126	Kilmaine	Ballinrobe	Ballinrobe
Knockadorraghy	432	Clanmorris	Mayo	Ballinrobe
Knockadrum	125	Burrishoole	Aghagower	Westport
Knockafall	130	Gallen	Templemore	Castlebar
Knockafarson (or Broadlands)	230	Tirawley	Ballysakeery	Ballina
Knockagarraun	237	Gallen	Templemore	Castlebar
Knockagarravaun	228	Tirawley	Crossmolina	Ballina
Knockaglana	1,035	Carra	Turlough	Castlebar
Knockagraffy	50	Clanmorris	Tagheen	Claremorris
Knockagreenaun	90	Carra	Ballyhean	Castlebar
Knockakeery	71	Burrishoole	Aghagower	Westport
Knockalassa	89	Kilmaine	Cong	Ballinrobe
Knockaleanore	108	Carra	Ballyovey	Ballinrobe
Knockalegan	152	Tirawley	Crossmolina	Ballina
Knockalegan	360	Kilmaine	Kilcommon	Ballinrobe
Knockalegan	112	Burrishoole	Burrishoole	Newport
Knockalinsky	141	Kilmaine	Robeen	Ballinrobe
Knockalough	51	Tirawley	Ballysakeery	Ballina
Knockanaconny	284	Costello	Castlemore	Castlereagh
Knockananeel	201	Clanmorris	Crossboyne	Claremorris
Knockananny	710	Tirawley	Moygawnagh	Killala
Knockanarra	145	Costello	Annagh	Claremorris
Knockaneden	238	Burrishoole	Islandeady	Westport
Knockanelo	146	Tirawley	Ardagh	Ballina
Knockanerrew	68	Carra	Ballyhean	Castlebar
Knockanillaun	169	Tirawley	Ardagh	Ballina
Knockanotish	293	Kilmaine	Ballinrobe	Ballinrobe
Knockanour	136	Carra	Turlough	Castlebar
Knockanroe	61	Clanmorris	Tagheen	Claremorris
Knockanumera	167	Tirawley	Crossmolina	Ballina
**Knockanyeveen**	Town	Burrishoole	Kilmeena	Westport
Knockaphunta	380	Carra	Aglish	Castlebar
Knockaraha	163	Carra	Ballintober	Castlebar
Knockaraha East	40	Murrisk	Oughaval	Westport
Knockaraha West	52	Murrisk	Oughaval	Westport
Knockaskeehaun	244	Tirawley	Kilfian	Ballina
Knockaskibbole	479	Carra	Aglish	Castlebar
Knockasproha	131	Burrishoole	Kilmeena	Westport
Knockataggart	87	Clanmorris	Tagheen	Claremorris
Knockatemple	299	Gallen	Kildacommoge	Castlebar
Knockatemple (or Drum)	208	Carra	Drum	Castlebar
Knockatinnole	150	Tirawley	Ballysakeery	Ballina
Knockatober	199	Clanmorris	Kilcolman	Claremorris
Knockatotaun	173	Carra	Rosslee	Ballinrobe
Knockatotaun	38	Kilmaine	Kilmainemore	Ballinrobe
Knockaun	280	Tirawley	Kilbride	Killala
Knockaunabroona	16	Clanmorris	Mayo	Claremorris
Knockaunacat	109	Costello	Bekan	Claremorris
Knockaunakill	448	Clanmorris	Mayo	Claremorris
Knockaunbaun	203	Tirawley	Crossmolina	Ballina
Knockaunderry	100	Tirawley	Ballysakeery	Ballina
Knockavanloman	97	Burrishoole	Kilmeena	Westport
Knockaveely Glebe	15	Burrishoole	Burrishoole	Newport
Knockavilla	141	Gallen	Meelick	Swineford
Knockavrony	170	Gallen	Kildacommoge	Castlebar
Knockballagh	104	Burrishoole	Kilmeena	Westport
Knockbaun	151	Carra	Drum	Castlebar
Knockbaun	161	Clanmorris	Knock	Claremorris
Knockbaun	306	Carra	Islandeady	Castlebar
Knockbaun	156	Tirawley	Crossmolina	Ballina
Knockbeg	56	Kilmaine	Cong	Ballinrobe
Knockboha	252	Tirawley	Lackan	Killala
Knockboy	146	Carra	Drum	Castlebar
Knockboy	109	Burrishoole	Kilmeena	Westport
Knockboy	37	Burrishoole	Burrishoole	Newport
Knockbrack	126	Costello	Kilmovee	Swineford
Knockbrack	410	Tirawley	Crossmolina	Ballina
Knockbrack	121	Gallen	Kilconduff	Swineford
Knockbrack	311	Costello	Annagh	Claremorris
Knockbrack	242	Burrishoole	Aghagower	Westport
Knockbrack	23	Clanmorris	Tagheen	Claremorris
Knockbrack (or Trouthill)	200	Costello	Kilbeagh	Swineford
Knockbreaga	146	Burrishoole	Burrishoole	Newport
Knockcahillaun	34	Burrishoole	Kilmeena	Westport
Knockduff	164	Tirawley	Ardagh	Ballina
Knockeen	249	Murrisk	Kilgeever	Westport
Knockeeragh	113	Burrishoole	Burrishoole	Newport
Knockegan and Cloonagh Beg	178	Tirawley	Ardagh	Ballina
Knockfadda	493	Gallen	Killasser	Swineford
Knockfarnaght	447	Tirawley	Addergoole	Castlebar
Knockfelim	66	Burrishoole	Aghagower	Westport
Knockfereen	84	Kilmaine	Ballinrobe	Ballinrobe
Knockfin	96	Murrisk	Oughaval	Westport
Knockfree	327	Tirawley	Kilbelfad	Ballina
Knockglass	325	Tirawley	Crossmolina	Ballina
Knockglass	311	Kilmaine	Ballinrobe	Ballinrobe
Knockglass	72	Burrishoole	Burrishoole	Newport
Knockglass	200	Burrishoole	Kilmaclasser	Westport
Knocklahard	221	Kilmaine	Ballinrobe	Ballinrobe
Knocklehaugh	270	Tirawley	Kilmoremoy	Ballina
Knockloughra	66	Burrishoole	Burrishoole	Newport
Knockmanagh	164	Gallen	Killasser	Swineford
Knockmanus	155	Burrishoole	Burrishoole	Newport
Knockmaria (or Addergoole)	227	Tirawley	Addergoole	Castlebar
Knockmore	631	Tirawley	Ballynahaglish	Ballina
Knockmore Eighter	114	Carra	Manulla	Castlebar
Knockmore Oughter	445	Carra	Manulla	Castlebar
Knockmoyle	94	Burrishoole	Kilmeena	Newport
Knockmoyle	3,799	Tirawley	Kilfian	Killala
Knockmoyle	506	Burrishoole	Burrishoole	Newport
Knockmoyleen	1,458	Erris	Kilcommon	Newport
Knockmoyleen	79	Burrishoole	Kilmaclasser	Westport
Knockmoyleen	152	Carra	Ballintober	Castlebar
Knockmuinard	162	Burrishoole	Kilmaclasser	Westport
Knockmullin	64	Gallen	Killasser	Swineford
Knocknaboley	315	Burrishoole	Kilmeena	Newport
Knocknacroagha	307	Kilmaine	Ballinrobe	Ballinrobe
Knocknadrimna	83	Kilmaine	Ballinrobe	Ballinrobe
Knocknadrimna	209	Kilmaine	Robeen	Ballinrobe
Knocknaganny	133	Kilmaine	Kilcommon	Ballinrobe
Knocknageeha	357	Kilmaine	Kilmainebeg	Ballinrobe
Knocknageeha	126	Burrishoole	Burrishoole	Newport
Knocknageehy	54	Carra	Breaghwy	Castlebar
Knocknagon	81	Tirawley	Kilfian	Killala
Knocknagool	150	Carra	Ballyovey	Ballinrobe
Knocknagulshy	240	Kilmaine	Ballinrobe	Ballinrobe
Knocknahorna	522	Tirawley	Crossmolina	Ballina
Knocknakillew	381	Kilmaine	Ballinrobe	Ballinrobe
Knocknakillew	95	Gallen	Templemore	Castlebar
Knocknalina	317	Erris	Kilmore	Belmullet
Knocknalower	760	Erris	Kilcommon	Belmullet
Knocknamoghalaun	196	Clanmorris	Mayo	Castlebar
Knocknamucklagh	355	Kilmaine	Ballinchalla	Ballinrobe
Knocknapisha	76	Kilmaine	Kilmainebeg	Ballinrobe
Knocknaskeagh	338	Gallen	Killasser	Swineford
Knocknaskeagh	638	Gallen	Killedan	Swineford
Knocknatinnyweel	144	Burrishoole	Burrishoole	Newport
Knocknaveagh	48	Carra	Drum	Castlebar
Knockranny	223	Gallen	Kilconduff	Swineford
Knockranny	183	Murrisk	Oughaval	Westport
Knockrawer	111	Carra	Breaghwy	Castlebar
Knockrickard	47	Clanmorris	Tagheen	Claremorris
Knockrickard	88	Clanmorris	Mayo	Claremorris
Knockroe	137	Kilmaine	Kilmainebeg	Ballinrobe
Knockroe	146	Costello	Annagh	Claremorris
Knockroe	368	Kilmaine	Kilmainemore	Ballinrobe
Knockroe	196	Kilmaine	Kilmolara	Ballinrobe
Knockroe	70	Tirawley	Templemurry	Killala
Knockroe	116	Clanmorris	Knock	Claremorris
Knockroe	582	Clanmorris	Mayo	Claremorris
Knockroosky	300	Burrishoole	Aghagower	Westport
Knocks	223	Gallen	Killasser	Swineford
Knocksaxon	551	Gallen	Templemore	Castlebar
Knocksbarrett	147	Tirawley	Kilmoremoy	Ballina
Knockshanbally	291	Gallen	Templemore	Castlebar
Knockshanbo	372	Erris	Kilmore	Belmullet
Knockthomas	201	Carra	Aglish	Castlebar
Knockychottaun	208	Burrishoole	Kilmeena	Westport
Knockysprickaun	128	Burrishoole	Kilmeena	Westport
Lack East	273	Carra	Turlough	Castlebar
Lack West	232	Carra	Turlough	Castlebar
Lackafinna	403	Kilmaine	Cong	Ballinrobe
Lackakeely	98	Murrisk	Kilgeever	Westport
Lackalustraun	807	Tirawley	Crossmolina	Ballina
Lackanhill	125	Tirawley	Lackan	Killala
Lackaun	188	Kilmaine	Ballinchalla	Ballinrobe
Lackaun	338	Burrishoole	Aghagower	Westport
Lackderg	181	Murrisk	Aghagower	Westport
Lady\'s Island	1	Carra	Ballintober	Castlebar
Lagakilleen	56	Carra	Drum	Castlebar
Lagcurragh	681	Gallen	Kilconduff	Swineford
Lagduff Beg	419	Erris	Kilcommon	Newport
Lagduff More	1,028	Erris	Kilcommon	Newport
Laghloon	484	Murrisk	Aghagower	Westport
Laghta Eighter	1,675	Murrisk	Kilgeever	Westport
Laghta Oughter	3,660	Murrisk	Kilgeever	Westport
Laghtadawannagh	185	Tirawley	Kilmoremoy	Ballina
Laghtanvack	2,177	Tirawley	Moygawnagh	Killala
Laghtavarry	404	Gallen	Kildacommoge	Castlebar
Laghtmacdurkan	511	Gallen	Meelick	Swineford
Laghtmurragha	1,269	Erris	Kilcommon	Belmullet
Lagnamuck	173	Clanmorris	Balla	Castlebar
Lagnavaddoge	35	Carra	Aglish	Castlebar
Lahardaun	461	Tirawley	Addergoole	Castlebar
Lakefield Lower	197	Carra	Manulla	Castlebar
Lakeland Upper	197	Carra	Manulla	Castlebar
Lakill	416	Gallen	Templemore	Castlebar
Lankill	253	Murrisk	Aghagower	Westport
Lanmore	1,131	Murrisk	Aghagower	Westport
Lappallagh	1,569	Carra	Islandeady	Westport
Laralae	145	Costello	Aghamore	Swineford
Largan	426	Carra	Turlough	Castlebar
Largan	103	Costello	Annagh	Claremorris
Largan	200	Gallen	Killedan	Swineford
Largan	829	Costello	Kilcolman	Castlereagh
Largan Beg	421	Erris	Kilcommon	Belmullet
Largan More	1,675	Erris	Kilcommon	Belmullet
Larganboy East	465	Costello	Bekan	Claremorris
Larganboy West	385	Costello	Bekan	Claremorris
Larganmore	898	Gallen	Killasser	Swineford
Lassanny	87	Costello	Bekan	Claremorris
Laughil	320	Tirawley	Crossmolina	Ballina
Laughil	226	Carra	Turlough	Castlebar
Lauvlyer	261	Tirawley	Ballysakeery	Ballina
Lavy Beg	302	Costello	Kilbeagh	Swineford
Lavy More	630	Costello	Kilbeagh	Swineford
Lawarren	20	Carra	Burriscarra	Ballinrobe
Lawaus	149	Kilmaine	Ballinchalla	Ballinrobe
Lawaus	426	Clanmorris	Crossboyne	Claremorris
Leadymore	61	Tirawley	Killala	Killala
Leam	262	Erris	Kilmore	Belmullet
Leamadartaun	890	Tirawley	Crossmolina	Ballina
Leamareha Island	3	Erris	Kilmore	Belmullet
Leamnahye Island	3	Carra	Ballyovey	Ballinrobe
Lecarrow	401	Burrishoole	Burrishoole	Newport
Lecarrow	276	Tirawley	Crossmolina	Ballina
Lecarrow	515	Costello	Annagh	Claremorris
Lecarrow	83	Tirawley	Addergoole	Castlebar
Lecarrow	107	Tirawley	Ballysakeery	Ballina
Lecarrow	74	Carra	Kildacommoge	Castlebar
Lecarrow	255	Kilmaine	Kilcommon	Ballinrobe
Lecarrow	434	Costello	Kilbeagh	Swineford
Lecarrow	50	Carra	Drum	Castlebar
Lecarrow	594	Murrisk	Kilgeever	Westport
Lecarrow	69	Kilmaine	Kilmainemore	Ballinrobe
Lecarrow	352	Costello	Knock	Claremorris
Lecarrow	157	Gallen	Meelick	Swineford
Lecarrowcloghagh	104	Tirawley	Crossmolina	Ballina
Lecarrowkilleen	246	Kilmaine	Cong	Ballinrobe
Lecarrowntemple	237	Tirawley	Lackan	Killala
Lecarrownwaddy	127	Tirawley	Moygawnagh	Killala
Lecarrowwanteean	173	Tirawley	Rathreagh	Killala
Leckanvy	786	Murrisk	Oughaval	Westport
Leckee	402	Gallen	Toomore	Swineford
Leckneen	132	Carra	Turlough	Castlebar
Lecky Rocks	11	Murrisk	Inishbofin	Clifden
Leedaun	97	Clanmorris	Crossboyne	Claremorris
Leenavesta	905	Murrisk	Oughaval	Westport
Legan	113	Murrisk	Kilgeever	Westport
Legaturrin	138	Clanmorris	Balla	Castlebar
Legaun	175	Clanmorris	Balla	Castlebar
Lehanagh	169	Clanmorris	Mayo	Ballinrobe
Lehinch Demesne	595	Kilmaine	Kilcommon	Ballinrobe
Lenacraigaboy	230	Murrisk	Oughaval	Westport
Lenamore	167	Costello	Bekan	Claremorris
Lenanaboll	86	Clanmorris	Tagheen	Claremorris
Lenanadurtaun	67	Erris	Kilcommon	Belmullet
Lenanadurtaun	1,066	Murrisk	Oughaval	Westport
Lenanasillagh	292	Carra	Islandeady	Castlebar
Lenanavea	875	Carra	Aglish	Castlebar
Lenarevagh	2,344	Erris	Kilcommon	Belmullet
Leo	387	Costello	Annagh	Claremorris
Lessanny	191	Tirawley	Moygawnagh	Killala
Letter	875	Burrishoole	Islandeady	Westport
Lettera	2,981	Erris	Kilcommon	Newport
Letterass	2,059	Murrisk	Aghagower	Westport
Letterass Island	1	Murrisk	Aghagower	Westport
Letterbeg	179	Erris	Kilmore	Belmullet
Letterbrick	1,149	Tirawley	Crossmolina	Ballina
Letterbrock	1,081	Murrisk	Aghagower	Westport
Lettereeragh	1,405	Murrisk	Kilgeever	Westport
Letterkeeghaun	1,254	Tirawley	Addergoole	Castlebar
Letterkeen	3,032	Burrishoole	Burrishoole	Newport
Letterlough	326	Burrishoole	Burrishoole	Newport
Lettermaghera North	1,160	Burrishoole	Burrishoole	Newport
Lettermaghera South	914	Burrishoole	Burrishoole	Newport
Lettermaglinskin	1,059	Murrisk	Aghagower	Westport
Letterneevoge	516	Tirawley	Crossmolina	Ballina
Lettertrask	1,350	Tirawley	Crossmolina	Ballina
Levallinree	355	Carra	Turlough	Castlebar
Levally	331	Kilmaine	Ballinrobe	Ballinrobe
Levally	241	Tirawley	Addergoole	Castlebar
Levallyroe	887	Costello	Annagh	Claremorris
Levallyroe	266	Clanmorris	Kilvine	Claremorris
Leveelick	193	Costello	Kilmovee	Swineford
Lightford	77	Carra	Breaghwy	Castlebar
Lisbaun	102	Gallen	Meelick	Swineford
Lisbaun	64	Clanmorris	Kilcolman	Claremorris
Lisbaun East	93	Costello	Bekan	Claremorris
Lisbaun West	30	Costello	Bekan	Claremorris
Lisblowick	168	Carra	Drum	Castlebar
Lisbrin	104	Tirawley	Doonfeeny	Killala
Lisbrogan	119	Gallen	Meelick	Swineford
Liscarney	393	Murrisk	Aghagower	Westport
Liscat	419	Costello	Aghamore	Claremorris
Lisclovaun	98	Burrishoole	Kilmeena	Westport
Liscluman	152	Costello	Bekan	Claremorris
Liscosker	160	Costello	Aghamore	Swineford
Liscottle	119	Gallen	Kilconduff	Swineford
Liscromwell	259	Carra	Aglish	Castlebar
Liscunnell	149	Carra	Ballyhean	Castlebar
Lisduff	159	Costello	Annagh	Claremorris
Lisduff	26	Burrishoole	Burrishoole	Newport
Lisduff	287	Gallen	Killedan	Swineford
Lisduff	360	Clanmorris	Crossboyne	Claremorris
Lisduff	228	Clanmorris	Kilcolman	Claremorris
Lisduff	66	Kilmaine	Kilmainemore	Ballinrobe
Lisduff	216	Gallen	Meelick	Swineford
Lisdurraun	151	Gallen	Meelick	Swineford
Lisduvoge	295	Tirawley	Kilbelfad	Ballina
Lisglennon	361	Tirawley	Ballysakeery	Ballina
Lisgormin	184	Gallen	Bohola	Swineford
Lisgowel	167	Carra	Breaghwy	Castlebar
Lisheenabrone	493	Gallen	Meelick	Swineford
Lisheenaveelish	25	Carra	Ballyhean	Castlebar
Lisheenielagaun	122	Kilmaine	Moorgagagh	Ballinrobe
Lisheenmanus	80	Kilmaine	Kilcommon	Ballinrobe
Liskilleen	543	Kilmaine	Ballinrobe	Ballinrobe
Lislackagh	160	Gallen	Meelick	Swineford
Lislaughera	243	Kilmaine	Cong	Ballinrobe
Lislaughna	291	Gallen	Killasser	Swineford
Lismaganshion	128	Costello	Aghamore	Swineford
Lismeegaun	250	Costello	Aghamore	Swineford
Lismiraun	326	Gallen	Bohola	Swineford
Lismolin	100	Burrishoole	Islandeady	Westport
Lismoran	439	Gallen	Killasser	Swineford
Lismurrew	209	Clanmorris	Kilcolman	Claremorris
Lisnaboley	49	Clanmorris	Kilcolman	Claremorris
Lisnacurley	136	Carra	Ballyhean	Castlebar
Lisnageeha (or Antigua)	157	Carra	Aglish	Castlebar
Lisnagross	192	Costello	Aghamore	Swineford
Lisnakirka (or Milebush)	214	Carra	Aglish	Castlebar
Lisnamaneeagh	115	Gallen	Killedan	Swineford
Lisnamoyle	167	Kilmaine	Kilcommon	Ballinrobe
Lisnaponra North	155	Carra	Ballyhean	Castlebar
Lisnaponra South	91	Carra	Ballyhean	Castlebar
Lisnaran	111	Carra	Breaghwy	Castlebar
Lisnolan	338	Carra	Manulla	Castlebar
Lispatrick	37	Costello	Knock	Claremorris
Lisrobert	64	Clanmorris	Tagheen	Claremorris
Lisrobert	214	Carra	Drum	Castlebar
Lissadrone East	240	Tirawley	Lackan	Killala
Lissadrone West	322	Tirawley	Lackan	Killala
Lissalacaun	132	Carra	Drum	Castlebar
Lissaniska	257	Kilmaine	Robeen	Ballinrobe
Lissaniska	168	Carra	Drum	Castlebar
Lissaniska	357	Carra	Kildacommoge	Castlebar
Lissaniska	826	Costello	Bekan	Claremorris
Lissaniska	72	Gallen	Bohola	Swineford
Lissaniska East	353	Tirawley	Ballynahaglish	Ballina
Lissaniska West	363	Tirawley	Ballynahaglish	Ballina
Lissanisky	311	Kilmaine	Ballinrobe	Ballinrobe
Lissanumera	97	Gallen	Kilconduff	Swineford
Lissard More	117	Gallen	Kilgarvan	Ballina
Lissatava	692	Kilmaine	Kilcommon	Ballinrobe
Lisseveleen & Skeheen	92	Kilmaine	Robeen	Ballinrobe
Lissymulgee	228	Costello	Kilbeagh	Swineford
Listernan	134	Gallen	Killasser	Swineford
Listrisnan	198	Gallen	Bohola	Swineford
Long Island	13	Carra	Ballyovey	Ballinrobe
Longfield	156	Gallen	Templemore	Castlebar
Longford	155	Tirawley	Crossmolina	Ballina
Loobnamuck	139	Gallen	Killasser	Swineford
Loona Beg	214	Carra	Drum	Castlebar
Loona More	290	Carra	Drum	Castlebar
Loosky Island	2	Carra	Turlough	Castlebar
Loughanaganky	133	Kilmaine	Ballinchalla	Ballinrobe
Loughanboy	177	Kilmaine	Kilmainemore	Ballinrobe
Loughanboy	188	Costello	Bekan	Claremorris
Loughaunnaman	223	Clanmorris	Kilcolman	Claremorris
Loughnahelly	478	Erris	Kilcommon	Belmullet
Loughnamucka	691	Murrisk	Kilgeever	Westport
Loughpark	82	Carra	Rosslee	Castlebar
Loughrusheen	426	Carra	Aglish	Castlebar
**Louisburgh**	Town	Murrisk	Kilgeever	Westport
Low Island	1	Carra	Islandeady	Castlebar
Lowpark	285	Costello	Kilbeagh	Swineford
Luffertaun	136	Carra	Ballintober	Castlebar
Lugalisheen North	190	Clanmorris	Crossboyne	Claremorris
Lugalisheen South	131	Clanmorris	Crossboyne	Claremorris
Lugaphuill	215	Carra	Drum	Castlebar
Lugaphuill	250	Carra	Ballyhean	Castlebar
Lugatallin	140	Kilmaine	Kilcommon	Ballinrobe
Lugatemple	206	Clanmorris	Kilcolman	Claremorris
Lugboy Demesne	244	Costello	Annagh	Claremorris
Lugbrack	52	Costello	Aghamore	Swineford
Lugganashlere	181	Carra	Turlough	Castlebar
Lugnafahy	110	Burrishoole	Kilmaclasser	Westport
Lugnalettin	1,704	Tirawley	Doonfeeny	Killala
Lugnavaddoge	173	Carra	Turlough	Castlebar
Lugrevagh	64	Burrishoole	Aghagower	Westport
Lung	855	Costello	Castlemore	Castlereagh
Lurga Lower	452	Costello	Kilbeagh	Swineford
Lurga Upper	632	Costello	Kilbeagh	Swineford
Lurgacloy	274	Erris	Kilmore	Belmullet
Lurgan	318	Costello	Aghamore	Swineford
Lurgan	305	Costello	Annagh	Claremorris
Lurgan	339	Costello	Bekan	Claremorris
Lurgandarragh	1,176	Erris	Kilcommon	Newport
Lynchsacres	61	Kilmaine	Robeen	Ballinrobe
Mace Lower	511	Clanmorris	Kilcolman	Claremorris
Mace Middle	377	Clanmorris	Kilcolman	Claremorris
Mace North	181	Burrishoole	Aghagower	Westport
Mace South	352	Burrishoole	Aghagower	Westport
Mace Upper	356	Clanmorris	Kilcolman	Claremorris
Macecrump	144	Erris	Kilmore	Belmullet
Macecrump Common	25	Erris	Kilmore	Belmullet
Magheraboy	516	Costello	Kilmovee	Swineford
Magheraboy	105	Gallen	Killasser	Swineford
Magheraboy	176	Costello	Kilcolman	Castlereagh
Magheraboy	110	Clanmorris	Kilcolman	Claremorris
Magherabrack	126	Tirawley	Ballysakeery	Ballina
Magherafadda	174	Carra	Ballyhean	Castlebar
Magheramore	522	Costello	Knock	Claremorris
Magheranagay	110	Carra	Ballyhean	Castlebar
Mahanagh	126	Burrishoole	Aghagower	Westport
Mallaranny	1,085	Burrishoole	Burrishoole	Newport
Mallaroe	101	Kilmaine	Kilcommon	Ballinrobe
Maltpool	249	Clanmorris	Tagheen	Claremorris
Mannin	274	Costello	Aghamore	Swineford
Manraghrory	157	Erris	Kilmore	Belmullet
**Manulla**	Town	Carra	Manulla	Castlebar
Manulla	194	Carra	Manulla	Castlebar
Massbrook Lower	765	Tirawley	Addergoole	Castlebar
Massbrook South	723	Tirawley	Addergoole	Castlebar
Massbrook Upper	677	Tirawley	Addergoole	Castlebar
Maum	104	Murrisk	Kilgeever	Westport
Maumaratta	2,796	Erris	Kilcommon	Newport
Maumeen	273	Carra	Ballintober	Castlebar
Maumnaman	569	Burrishoole	Achill	Newport
Mauteoge	103	Tirawley	Crossmolina	Ballina
Mayfield	302	Clanmorris	Crossboyne	Claremorris
Mayo Parks	80	Clanmorris	Mayo	Claremorris
Meelick	448	Clanmorris	Crossboyne	Claremorris
Meelick	208	Carra	Turlough	Castlebar
Meelick	207	Tirawley	Killala	Killala
Meelick	122	Gallen	Meelick	Swineford
Meelick Beg	80	Clanmorris	Kilcolman	Claremorris
Meelick More	305	Clanmorris	Kilcolman	Claremorris
Meeltran	325	Costello	Aghamore	Claremorris
Meennacloghfinny	1,337	Burrishoole	Burrishoole	Newport
Meermihil	51	Murrisk	Oughaval	Westport
Meneen	154	Burrishoole	Aghagower	Westport
Middlequarter	612	Murrisk	Inishbofin	Clifden
Middletown	134	Carra	Kildacommoge	Castlebar
Midgefield (or Tawnynameeltoge)	209	Murrisk	Aghagower	Westport
Milcum	79	Burrishoole	Burrishoole	Newport
Milebush (or Lisnakirka)	214	Carra	Aglish	Castlebar
Milford Demesne	460	Kilmaine	Kilmainemore	Ballinrobe
Millbrook	43	Clanmorris	Crossboyne	Claremorris
Millerhill	116	Carra	Ballintober	Castlebar
Moat	210	Clanmorris	Balla	Castlebar
Moat	251	Costello	Annagh	Claremorris
Moat	339	Carra	Ballintober	Castlebar
Mocollagan	185	Kilmaine	Shrule	Ballinrobe
Mocorha	603	Kilmaine	Shrule	Ballinrobe
Monagarraun	492	Carra	Islandeady	Castlebar
Monamore	101	Murrisk	Aghagower	Westport
Monard	82	Clanmorris	Mayo	Castlebar
Moneen	101	Tirawley	Rathreagh	Killala
Moneen	154	Murrisk	Kilgeever	Westport
Moneenbradagh	136	Carra	Aglish	Castlebar
Money	215	Burrishoole	Kilmeena	Westport
Moneybeg Island	9	Burrishoole	Kilmeena	Westport
Moneymore	202	Costello	Annagh	Claremorris
Moneynierin	1,431	Tirawley	Crossmolina	Ballina
Monumentpark	66	Carra	Turlough	Castlebar
Moorbrook	281	Gallen	Toomore	Swineford
Moorehall (or Muckloon)	130	Carra	Burriscarra	Ballinrobe
Moorgagagh	101	Kilmaine	Moorgagagh	Ballinrobe
Mossbrook	371	Clanmorris	Mayo	Claremorris
Mountain	221	Costello	Bekan	Claremorris
Mountain Common	290	Murrisk	Kilgeever	Westport
Mountaincommon	942	Costello	Aghamore	Swineford
Mountbrown	304	Burrishoole	Aghagower	Westport
Mountgregory	109	Carra	Aglish	Castlebar
Mounthenry	235	Kilmaine	Shrule	Ballinrobe
Mountpleasant	117	Carra	Touaghty	Ballinrobe
Moyhastin	398	Burrishoole	Aghagower	Westport
Moyhenna	162	Carra	Kildacommoge	Castlebar
Moylanboy	1	Murrisk	Inishbofin	Clifden
Moyna	193	Burrishoole	Kilmeena	Westport
Moyne	394	Tirawley	Killala	Killala
Moyne	880	Kilmaine	Shrule	Ballinrobe
Moynish More	61	Burrishoole	Burrishoole	Newport
Moyny	217	Tirawley	Kilbride	Killala
Moyour	225	Burrishoole	Kilmeena	Westport
Moyrahan	990	Erris	Kilmore	Belmullet
Muckanagh	1,053	Carra	Islandeady	Castlebar
Muckanagh	698	Carra	Turlough	Castlebar
Muckinish	25	Burrishoole	Burrishoole	Newport
Mucklagh	101	Burrishoole	Kilmeena	Westport
Muckloon (or Moorehall)	130	Carra	Burriscarra	Ballinrobe
Muckrussaun	249	Kilmaine	Ballinchalla	Ballinrobe
Muingaghel	2,140	Erris	Kilcommon	Belmullet
Muinganierin	1,027	Tirawley	Doonfeeny	Killala
Muingatogher	1,129	Murrisk	Oughaval	Westport
Muingelly	311	Tirawley	Doonfeeny	Killala
Muingerroon North	153	Erris	Kilcommon	Belmullet
Muingerroon South	1,453	Erris	Kilcommon	Belmullet
Muingingaun	2,190	Erris	Kilcommon	Belmullet
Muingmore	2,227	Erris	Kilcommon	Belmullet
Muingnabo	2,991	Erris	Kilcommon	Belmullet
Muingnahalloona	1,599	Erris	Kilcommon	Belmullet
Muingnanarnad	1,058	Erris	Kilcommon	Belmullet
Muingrevagh	198	Tirawley	Kilbride	Killala
Muings	914	Erris	Kilcommon	Belmullet
Mullafarry	322	Tirawley	Ballysakeery	Ballina
Mullagh	339	Murrisk	Oughaval	Westport
Mullaghawny	555	Gallen	Attymass	Ballina
Mullaghroe	336	Erris	Kilmore	Belmullet
Mullaun	50	Burrishoole	Burrishoole	Newport
Mullauns	63	Tirawley	Kilmoremoy	Ballina
Mullenmadoge	332	Costello	Kilbeagh	Swineford
Mullenmmore North	251	Tirawley	Crossmolina	Ballina
Mullenmmore South	245	Tirawley	Crossmolina	Ballina
Mungaun	949	Tirawley	Crossmolina	Ballina
Munnadesha	105	Kilmaine	Kilmolara	Ballinrobe
Murneen North	737	Clanmorris	Kilcolman	Claremorris
Murneen South	393	Clanmorris	Kilcolman	Claremorris
Murrevagh	1,014	Burrishoole	Burrishoole	Newport
Murrisk Demesne	33	Murrisk	Oughaval	Westport
Murrisknaboll	87	Murrisk	Oughaval	Westport
Musicfield	76	Kilmaine	Kilmainemore	Ballinrobe
Mweelawn Island	4	Murrisk	Kilgeever	Westport
Mweelin	765	Murrisk	Kilgeever	Westport
Mweelin	1,444	Burrishoole	Achill	Newport
Mweelis	127	Kilmaine	Kilmainemore	Ballinrobe
Mweewillin	1,284	Burrishoole	Achill	Newport
Mylesestate	44	Kilmaine	Kilmainemore	Ballinrobe
Nakil (or Surgeview)	221	Erris	Kilmore	Belmullet
Nealepark	444	Kilmaine	Kilmolara	Ballinrobe
Newantrim	206	Carra	Aglish	Castlebar
Newcastle	438	Gallen	Meelick	Swineford
Newfield	151	Burrishoole	Burrishoole	Newport
Newpark	468	Gallen	Kilconduff	Swineford
**Newport**	Town	Burrishoole	Burrishoole	Newport
Newport	69	Burrishoole	Burrishoole	Newport
Newtown	517	Carra	Ballyovey	Ballinrobe
Newtown	494	Erris	Kilmore	Belmullet
Newtown	290	Tirawley	Kilbelfad	Ballina
Newtown	475	Carra	Burriscarra	Castlebar
**Newtown Dillon**	Town	Costello	Kilbeagh	Swineford
Newtown North	84	Clanmorris	Crossboyne	Claremorris
Newtown South	191	Clanmorris	Crossboyne	Claremorris
Newtownwhite	328	Tirawley	Ballysakeery	Ballina
Nure	70	Tirawley	Ardagh	Ballina
Nymphsfield	192	Kilmaine	Cong	Ballinrobe
Oghillees	842	Burrishoole	Burrishoole	Newport
Oldcastle	270	Gallen	Meelick	Swineford
Oldhead	244	Murrisk	Kilgeever	Westport
Oory	455	Clanmorris	Tagheen	Claremorris
Oughtagh	291	Gallen	Templemore	Castlebar
Oughterard (or Caurans Upper)	119	Carra	Turlough	Castlebar
Oughty	1,277	Murrisk	Oughaval	Westport
Oultauns	203	Kilmaine	Kilcommon	Ballinrobe
Owenanirragh	1,413	Erris	Kilcommon	Belmullet
Owenboy	1,239	Tirawley	Crossmolina	Ballina
Owenduff	2,023	Burrishoole	Achill	Newport
Owenduff	2,138	Erris	Kilcommon	Newport
Owenglass	1,306	Erris	Kilcommon	Newport
Owenwee	1,561	Murrisk	Oughaval	Westport
Ox Island	1	Murrisk	Inishbofin	Clifden
Oxford	319	Gallen	Killedan	Swineford
Park	183	Carra	Turlough	Castlebar
Park	102	Costello	Kilbeagh	Swineford
Parkatleva	72	Clanmorris	Kilcolman	Claremorris
Parkboy	35	Carra	Ballyhean	Castlebar
Parknakillew	227	Clanmorris	Tagheen	Claremorris
Parknashingaun	31	Carra	Rosslee	Castlebar
Parks	439	Carra	Touaghty	Ballinrobe
Pattenspark	137	Costello	Annagh	Claremorris
Peenoge	103	Carra	Rosslee	Castlebar
Pheasanthill	149	Carra	Aglish	Castlebar
Pig Island	6	Erris	Kilcommon	Belmullet
Pig Island	5	Carra	Ballyovey	Ballinrobe
Pollacappul	110	Costello	Annagh	Claremorris
Pollacappul	415	Erris	Kilmore	Belmullet
Polladoohy	461	Tirawley	Crossmolina	Ballina
Pollagarraun	523	Erris	Kilcommon	Belmullet
Pollagh	320	Gallen	Templemore	Castlebar
Pollalena	74	Carra	Drum	Castlebar
Pollanaskan	186	Carra	Breaghwy	Castlebar
Pollaniska	78	Clanmorris	Crossboyne	Claremorris
Pollanoughty	916	Murrisk	Oughaval	Westport
Pollatomich (or Kilcommon)	672	Erris	Kilcommon	Belmullet
Pollavaddy	388	Clanmorris	Balla	Castlebar
Pollawaddy	47	Clanmorris	Mayo	Claremorris
Pollawaddy	160	Carra	Ballintober	Castlebar
Pollawarla	482	Tirawley	Addergoole	Castlebar
Pollaweela	207	Kilmaine	Kilcommon	Ballinrobe
Pollbaun	320	Kilmaine	Kilcommon	Ballinrobe
Pollboy	192	Erris	Kilcommon	Belmullet
Pollboy	170	Costello	Castlemore	Castlereagh
Polldrian	164	Clanmorris	Tagheen	Claremorris
Pollnabunny	155	Kilmaine	Kilmainebeg	Ballinrobe
Pollnacartan	23	Kilmaine	Kilcommon	Ballinrobe
Pollnacroaghy	79	Costello	Bekan	Claremorris
Pollnagawna	204	Gallen	Meelick	Swineford
Pollnasillagh	115	Clanmorris	Crossboyne	Claremorris
Pollraddy	147	Kilmaine	Kilcommon	Ballinrobe
Pollranny (Lynchaghan)	897	Burrishoole	Achill	Newport
Pollranny (Sweeny)	1,104	Burrishoole	Achill	Newport
Pollronahan Beg	79	Gallen	Killedan	Swineford
Pollronahan More	236	Gallen	Killedan	Swineford
Pollsharvoge	365	Gallen	Meelick	Swineford
Port Island	20	Murrisk	Inishbofin	Clifden
Portacloy	922	Erris	Kilcommon	Belmullet
Portagh	326	Clanmorris	Mayo	Claremorris
Portroyal	443	Carra	Ballyovey	Ballinrobe
Porturlin	2,120	Erris	Kilcommon	Belmullet
Prebaun	258	Gallen	Killasser	Swineford
Prison East	181	Carra	Manulla	Castlebar
Prison North	340	Carra	Manulla	Castlebar
Prison South	254	Carra	Manulla	Castlebar
Prospect	144	Tirawley	Crossmolina	Ballina
Prughlish	433	Tirawley	Addergoole	Castlebar
Puntabeg	153	Costello	Kilbeagh	Swineford
Purrauns	547	Kilmaine	Kilcommon	Ballinrobe
Quinsheen Island	2	Burrishoole	Kilmeena	Westport
Rabaun	229	Gallen	Meelick	Swineford
Rabbit Island	1	Kilmaine	Cong	Ballinrobe
Rabbit Island	14	Burrishoole	Burrishoole	Newport
Rabbit Island	20	Burrishoole	Kilmeena	Westport
Rabbit Island	1	Kilmaine	Cong	Ballinrobe
Rahans	237	Tirawley	Ballynahaglish	Ballina
Rahard	305	Kilmaine	Robeen	Ballinrobe
Rahard	151	Kilmaine	Kilcommon	Ballinrobe
Rahard	254	Kilmaine	Ballinrobe	Ballinrobe
Raheen Barr	594	Carra	Islandeady	Castlebar
Raheenabbeyland	84	Kilmaine	Robeen	Ballinrobe
Raheenduff	88	Carra	Burriscarra	Ballinrobe
Raheenroe	43	Tirawley	Kilfian	Killala
Raheens	290	Carra	Islandeady	Castlebar
Raheens	145	Tirawley	Ballysakeery	Ballina
Raherolus	239	Costello	Kilmovee	Swineford
Raigh	435	Murrisk	Aghagower	Westport
Raigh	84	Burrishoole	Burrishoole	Newport
Raish	86	Tirawley	Kilmoremoy	Ballina
Ramolin	620	Kilmaine	Shrule	Ballinrobe
Ranaghy	274	Burrishoole	Islandeady	Westport
Ranagissaun	287	Costello	Kilmovee	Swineford
Ranaranny	167	Costello	Kilbeagh	Swineford
Ranns	128	Carra	Ballintober	Castlebar
Rappacastle	288	Tirawley	Ardagh	Ballina
Rassakeeran	78	Burrishoole	Kilmeena	Westport
Rassaraun	42	Clanmorris	Tagheen	Claremorris
Rath	659	Costello	Aghamore	Swineford
Rathavisteen	1,735	Tirawley	Doonfeeny	Killala
Rathbal	833	Tirawley	Ballysakeery	Ballina
Rathbaun	20	Tirawley	Rathreagh	Killala
Rathbaun	211	Tirawley	Templemurry	Killala
Rathbaun	391	Tirawley	Ballynahaglish	Ballina
Rathbaun	131	Carra	Aglish	Castlebar
Rathbaun	239	Tirawley	Kilbelfad	Ballina
Rathcarreen	116	Kilmaine	Ballinrobe	Ballinrobe
Rathcash	324	Tirawley	Killala	Killala
Rathduff	431	Clanmorris	Balla	Castlebar
Rathduff	193	Clanmorris	Mayo	Castlebar
Rathduff	262	Tirawley	Kilbelfad	Ballina
Ratheskin	612	Tirawley	Kilfian	Killala
Rathfran	295	Tirawley	Templemurry	Killala
Rathfranpark	127	Tirawley	Templemurry	Killala
Rathglass	111	Tirawley	Kilfian	Ballina
Rathglass East	158	Tirawley	Ballysakeery	Ballina
Rathglass West	158	Tirawley	Ballysakeery	Ballina
**Rathgranagher**	Town	Kilmaine	Kilmainemore	Ballinrobe
Rathgranagher (Lindsay)	277	Kilmaine	Kilmainemore	Ballinrobe
Rathgranagher (Miller)	672	Kilmaine	Kilmainemore	Ballinrobe
Rathkelly	181	Kilmaine	Ballinrobe	Ballinrobe
**Rathlackan**	Town	Tirawley	Kilcummin	Killala
Rathlackan	642	Tirawley	Kilcummin	Killala
Rathmacostello	110	Tirawley	Crossmolina	Ballina
Rathmalikeen	129	Kilmaine	Kilcommon	Ballinrobe
Rathmore	626	Tirawley	Crossmolina	Ballina
Rathmorgan	965	Erris	Kilcommon	Belmullet
Rathmoyle	123	Tirawley	Crossmolina	Ballina
Rathnaconeen	193	Tirawley	Ballynahaglish	Ballina
Rathnacreeva	694	Carra	Rosslee	Ballinrobe
Rathnadoffy	183	Tirawley	Rathreagh	Killala
Rathnaguppaun	282	Kilmaine	Ballinrobe	Ballinrobe
Rathnamagh	752	Tirawley	Kilfian	Ballina
Rathnawooraun	120	Tirawley	Templemurry	Killala
Rathoma	626	Tirawley	Ballysakeery	Ballina
Rathoonagh	551	Tirawley	Kilbride	Killala
Rathowen East	246	Tirawley	Killala	Killala
Rathowen West	221	Tirawley	Killala	Killala
Rathreagh	199	Tirawley	Rathreagh	Killala
Rathredmond	144	Carra	Manulla	Castlebar
Rathredmond	331	Kilmaine	Ballinrobe	Ballinrobe
Rathreedaun	659	Gallen	Kilgarvan	Ballina
Rathroe	184	Tirawley	Kilfian	Killala
Rathroeen	709	Tirawley	Ballysakeery	Ballina
Rathrowan	293	Gallen	Bohola	Swineford
Rathrushel	129	Gallen	Templemore	Castlebar
Rathscanlan	252	Gallen	Kilconduff	Swineford
Rathslevin	312	Gallen	Bohola	Swineford
Rausakeera North	83	Kilmaine	Kilmainemore	Ballinrobe
Rausakeera South	79	Kilmaine	Kilmainemore	Ballinrobe
Reask	478	Costello	Bekan	Claremorris
Red Island	6	Kilmaine	Shrule	Ballinrobe
Redhill	173	Gallen	Templemore	Castlebar
Redhill	215	Costello	Annagh	Claremorris
Richmond	201	Tirawley	Crossmolina	Ballina
Rinagall	9	Tirawley	Kilbelfad	Ballina
Rinagry	431	Tirawley	Kilbelfad	Ballina
Rinakilleen	26	Tirawley	Kilbelfad	Ballina
Rinanagh	218	Erris	Kilmore	Belmullet
Rinaneel	180	Carra	Burriscarra	Ballinrobe
Rinbrack	515	Gallen	Meelick	Swineford
Ringarraun	179	Carra	Ballyhean	Castlebar
Rinmore	181	Tirawley	Kilbelfad	Ballina
Rinn	185	Costello	Aghamore	Swineford
Rinnahulty	160	Carra	Manulla	Castlebar
Rinnananny	444	Gallen	Toomore	Swineford
Rinnaseer	180	Burrishoole	Islandeady	Westport
Rinnashinnagh	551	Erris	Kilcommon	Belmullet
Rinshinna	161	Carra	Breaghwy	Castlebar
River Island	6	Carra	Ballyovey	Ballinrobe
Robeen	142	Kilmaine	Robeen	Ballinrobe
Robeenard	443	Kilmaine	Kilcommon	Ballinrobe
Rockfield	874	Clanmorris	Kilcolman	Claremorris
Rockfield	237	Burrishoole	Aghagower	Westport
Rockfield	365	Carra	Turlough	Castlebar
Rockfleet	92	Burrishoole	Burrishoole	Newport
Rocksborough North	109	Kilmaine	Ballinrobe	Ballinrobe
Rocksborough South	177	Kilmaine	Ballinrobe	Ballinrobe
Roe Island	5	Tirawley	Crossmolina	Ballina
Roeillan	3	Murrisk	Oughaval	Westport
Roeillan	2	Burrishoole	Achill	Newport
Roeillaun	15	Burrishoole	Burrishoole	Newport
Roekilmeena	220	Burrishoole	Kilmeena	Westport
Roemore	88	Carra	Breaghwy	Castlebar
Roemore	132	Burrishoole	Kilmeena	Newport
Roman Island	8	Murrisk	Oughaval	Westport
Rooaunalaghta	68	Kilmaine	Shrule	Ballinrobe
Rooghan	149	Tirawley	Rathreagh	Killala
Rooghaun	127	Carra	Burriscarra	Ballinrobe
Rooghaun	334	Murrisk	Aghagower	Westport
Roonah	847	Murrisk	Kilgeever	Westport
Roonkeel	74	Murrisk	Kilgeever	Westport
Roos	636	Kilmaine	Kilcommon	Ballinrobe
Roosky	222	Clanmorris	Crossboyne	Claremorris
Roosky	867	Gallen	Attymass	Ballina
Roosky	1,685	Costello	Kilbeagh	Swineford
Roosky	644	Costello	Knock	Claremorris
Roosky	240	Tirawley	Moygawnagh	Killala
Rooskybeg	69	Clanmorris	Crossboyne	Claremorris
Rosbarnagh Island	52	Burrishoole	Burrishoole	Newport
Rosbeg	26	Burrishoole	Kilmeena	Newport
Roscahill	240	Burrishoole	Kilmeena	Westport
Rosclave	108	Burrishoole	Burrishoole	Newport
Rosdoagh	1,446	Erris	Kilcommon	Belmullet
Rosdooaun	230	Burrishoole	Kilmeena	Newport
Rosgalliv	275	Burrishoole	Burrishoole	Newport
Rosgibbileen	102	Burrishoole	Burrishoole	Newport
Roskeen North	202	Burrishoole	Burrishoole	Newport
Roskeen South	127	Burrishoole	Burrishoole	Newport
Roslahan Lower	165	Carra	Drum	Castlebar
Roslahan Upper	159	Carra	Drum	Castlebar
Roslaher	51	Burrishoole	Kilmeena	Newport
Roslynagh	15	Burrishoole	Burrishoole	Newport
Rosmindle	83	Burrishoole	Kilmeena	Westport
Rosmoney	120	Burrishoole	Kilmeena	Westport
Rosmore	77	Burrishoole	Burrishoole	Newport
Rosnagleragh	355	Erris	Kilcommon	Belmullet
Rosnakilly	51	Burrishoole	Kilmeena	Westport
Ross	293	Tirawley	Killala	Killala
Ross (Bourke)	133	Tirawley	Killala	Killala
Ross (Fallon)	169	Tirawley	Killala	Killala
Ross (Gardiner)	124	Tirawley	Killala	Killala
Ross (Goodwin)	243	Tirawley	Killala	Killala
Ross East	273	Carra	Turlough	Castlebar
Ross West	438	Carra	Turlough	Castlebar
Rossanrubble	174	Burrishoole	Burrishoole	Newport
Rossbeg	136	Murrisk	Oughaval	Westport
Rosserk	1,074	Tirawley	Ballysakeery	Ballina
Rossmurrevagh	28	Burrishoole	Burrishoole	Newport
Rossow	181	Burrishoole	Kilmeena	Newport
Rossymailley	42	Murrisk	Oughaval	Westport
Rossyvera	74	Burrishoole	Burrishoole	Newport
Rostoohy	57	Burrishoole	Kilmeena	Westport
Rosturk	795	Burrishoole	Burrishoole	Newport
Rosturk	34	Burrishoole	Burrishoole	Newport
Roy	2,403	Erris	Kilcommon	Belmullet
Rubble	245	Gallen	Killasser	Swineford
Rush Hill	127	Carra	Manulla	Castlebar
Rushbrook	104	Burrishoole	Kilmaclasser	Westport
Rushbrook East	151	Clanmorris	Crossboyne	Claremorris
Rushbrook West	42	Clanmorris	Crossboyne	Claremorris
Rusheen	232	Burrishoole	Kilmeena	Westport
Rusheen	39	Clanmorris	Tagheen	Claremorris
Rusheen (or Thomastown)	212	Carra	Drum	Castlebar
Rusheen Island	4	Erris	Kilmore	Belmullet
Rusheens	18	Burrishoole	Burrishoole	Newport
Rusheens	271	Tirawley	Ballysakeery	Ballina
Rusheens East	121	Costello	Kilmovee	Swineford
Rusheens West	161	Costello	Kilmovee	Swineford
Saints Island	11	Kilmaine	Cong	Ballinrobe
Saleen	33	Kilmaine	Ballinrobe	Ballinrobe
Saleen	83	Carra	Aglish	Castlebar
Salia	1,898	Burrishoole	Achill	Newport
Sallagher	146	Carra	Turlough	Castlebar
Sallyhernaun	248	Costello	Knock	Claremorris
Sandymount	48	Burrishoole	Burrishoole	Newport
Sanhill	73	Burrishoole	Burrishoole	Newport
Sarnaght	434	Carra	Aglish	Castlebar
Scardaun	1,274	Erris	Kilcommon	Newport
Scardaun	230	Costello	Aghamore	Swineford
Scardaun East	243	Clanmorris	Crossboyne	Claremorris
Scardaun West	180	Clanmorris	Crossboyne	Claremorris
Scotchfort	155	Tirawley	Kilbelfad	Ballina
Scregg	400	Costello	Annagh	Claremorris
Scregg	234	Costello	Aghamore	Swineford
Seeaghanbaun	109	Tirawley	Kilfian	Killala
Seeaghandoo	163	Tirawley	Kilfian	Killala
Seefin	508	Clanmorris	Crossboyne	Claremorris
Seerillaun	3	Carra	Ballyovey	Ballinrobe
Sessiagh	140	Clanmorris	Tagheen	Claremorris
Shammerbaun	411	Costello	Kilmovee	Swineford
Shammerdoo	955	Costello	Kilmovee	Swineford
Shanagh	15	Burrishoole	Aghagower	Westport
Shanaghmoyle	161	Costello	Knock	Claremorris
Shanaghy	837	Erris	Kilmore	Belmullet
Shanaghy	189	Gallen	Bohola	Swineford
Shanaghy	128	Tirawley	Kilbride	Killala
Shanclogh	203	Tirawley	Ballynahaglish	Ballina
Shandrum	198	Burrishoole	Kilmeena	Newport
Shanettra	1,420	Tirawley	Kilfian	Killala
Shangorman (or Inishangan)	16	Kilmaine	Ballinrobe	Ballinrobe
Shangort	265	Carra	Ballyovey	Ballinrobe
Shannasmore	329	Tirawley	Ballynahaglish	Ballina
Shanrawy	100	Carra	Rosslee	Castlebar
Shantallow	330	Kilmaine	Kilcommon	Ballinrobe
Shanvaghera	449	Costello	Knock	Claremorris
Shanvally	275	Gallen	Killedan	Swineford
Shanvally	57	Carra	Breaghwy	Castlebar
Shanvallyard	589	Carra	Ballyovey	Ballinrobe
Shanvallybeg	1,170	Murrisk	Oughaval	Westport
Shanvallybeg	77	Burrishoole	Kilmeena	Westport
Shanvallyboght	118	Clanmorris	Kilvine	Claremorris
Shanvallyhugh	126	Burrishoole	Burrishoole	Newport
Shanvodinnaun	2,277	Tirawley	Moygawnagh	Killala
Shanvolahan	1,196	Tirawley	Crossmolina	Ballina
Shanvoley	677	Carra	Turlough	Castlebar
Shanwar	328	Gallen	Toomore	Swineford
Sheean	381	Burrishoole	Islandeady	Westport
Sheean	2,096	Erris	Kilcommon	Belmullet
Sheeanmore	2,650	Erris	Kilcommon	Newport
Sheeans	868	Carra	Turlough	Castlebar
Sheeroe	138	Murrisk	Aghagower	Westport
Sheskin	7,012	Erris	Kilcommon	Belmullet
Shinganagh	269	Clanmorris	Mayo	Claremorris
Shinnagh	175	Carra	Turlough	Castlebar
Shintilla	1	Kilmaine	Ballinchalla	Ballinrobe
Shraigh		Erris	Kilcommon	Belmullet
**Shrule**	Town	Kilmaine	Shrule	Ballinrobe
Shrule	1,378	Kilmaine	Shrule	Ballinrobe
Sixnoggins	682	Murrisk	Kilgeever	Westport
Skeaghard	116	Costello	Bekan	Claremorris
Skealoghan	301	Kilmaine	Kilcommon	Ballinrobe
Skehahagh	128	Carra	Ballintober	Castlebar
Skehanagh Lower	258	Carra	Ballintober	Castlebar
Skehanagh Upper	174	Carra	Ballintober	Castlebar
Skehavaud	211	Clanmorris	Crossboyne	Claremorris
Skeheen	180	Costello	Kilmovee	Swineford
Skeheen and Lisseveleen	92	Kilmaine	Robeen	Ballinrobe
Skerdagh Lower	515	Burrishoole	Burrishoole	Newport
Skerdagh Upper	1,186	Burrishoole	Burrishoole	Newport
Skiddernagh	290	Carra	Manulla	Castlebar
Slaugar	213	Burrishoole	Kilmeena	Westport
Slievemore	3,722	Burrishoole	Achill	Newport
Slievenabrehan	153	Clanmorris	Knock	Claremorris
Slievenagark	218	Tirawley	Ardagh	Ballina
Slinaun	179	Burrishoole	Kilmaclasser	Westport
Slinaunroe	286	Burrishoole	Kilmaclasser	Westport
Slishmeen	79	Carra	Rosslee	Ballinrobe
Smuttanagh	244	Carra	Manulla	Castlebar
Snugborough	370	Carra	Aglish	Castlebar
Sonnagh	1,480	Costello	Kilbeagh	Swineford
Sonvolaun	681	Costello	Kilmovee	Swineford
Spaddagh	203	Costello	Annagh	Claremorris
Speck	126	Costello	Kilbeagh	Swineford
Springfield	50	Carra	Aglish	Castlebar
Springhill	133	Tirawley	Rathreagh	Killala
Springvale	27	Kilmaine	Ballinrobe	Ballinrobe
Srah	1,378	Erris	Kilcommon	Belmullet
Srah	178	Tirawley	Ballynahaglish	Ballina
Srah	912	Carra	Ballyovey	Ballinrobe
Srah	67	Costello	Knock	Claremorris
Srah Lower	322	Costello	Kilbeagh	Swineford
Srah Upper	541	Costello	Kilbeagh	Swineford
Srahacorick	756	Burrishoole	Burrishoole	Newport
Srahanarry	197	Erris	Kilcommon	Belmullet
Srahataggle	4,167	Erris	Kilcommon	Belmullet
Srahataggle South	649	Erris	Kilcommon	Belmullet
Srahatloe	1,432	Murrisk	Aghagower	Westport
Srahdugghaun	3,435	Erris	Kilcommon	Newport
Srahederdaowen	341	Erris	Kilcommon	Newport
Sraheen	675	Tirawley	Ballynahaglish	Ballina
Sraheen	1,127	Burrishoole	Aghagower	Westport
Sraheens	278	Costello	Kilmovee	Swineford
Sraheens	2,207	Burrishoole	Achill	Newport
Sraheens	251	Gallen	Bohola	Swineford
Srahgraddy	1,262	Erris	Kilcommon	Belmullet
Srahlaghy	1,229	Tirawley	Doonfeeny	Killala
Srahlea	321	Murrisk	Aghagower	Westport
Srahmeen	1,792	Tirawley	Kilfian	Killala
Srahmore	353	Burrishoole	Achill	Newport
Srahmore	3,352	Burrishoole	Burrishoole	Newport
Srahmore	590	Erris	Kilcommon	Belmullet
Srahnacloy	1,101	Murrisk	Kilgeever	Westport
Srahnakilly	3,395	Erris	Kilcommon	Belmullet
Srahnamanragh	1,050	Erris	Kilcommon	Newport
Srahnanagh	106	Murrisk	Kilgeever	Westport
Srahnaplaia	1,985	Erris	Kilcommon	Belmullet
Srahnashasky	83	Murrisk	Kilgeever	Westport
Srahrevagh	1,288	Burrishoole	Burrishoole	Newport
Srahrevagh	719	Murrisk	Kilgeever	Westport
Srahroosky	1,032	Murrisk	Kilgeever	Westport
Srahwee	507	Murrisk	Kilgeever	Westport
Srahyconigaun	540	Tirawley	Crossmolina	Ballina
Sralagagh East	36	Tirawley	Doonfeeny	Killala
Sralagagh West	1,662	Tirawley	Doonfeeny	Killala
Sranacally	654	Tirawley	Crossmolina	Ballina
Sranalaghta North	35	Tirawley	Crossmolina	Ballina
Sranalaghta South	70	Tirawley	Crossmolina	Ballina
Sranalee	183	Carra	Turlough	Castlebar
Stags of Bofin	7	Murrisk	Inishbofin	Clifden
Steelaun	168	Tirawley	Templemurry	Killala
Stonehall	242	Tirawley	Ballynahaglish	Ballina
Stonepark	92	Carra	Touaghty	Ballinrobe
Stonepark	72	Carra	Rosslee	Castlebar
Strade	500	Gallen	Templemore	Castlebar
Strake	431	Murrisk	Kilgeever	Westport
Strandhill	176	Kilmaine	Cong	Ballinrobe
Streamstown	136	Murrisk	Oughaval	Westport
Streamstown	295	Clanmorris	Kilcolman	Claremorris
Stripe	194	Costello	Kilbeagh	Swineford
Struaun	59	Carra	Aglish	Castlebar
Stuckeen	183	Carra	Touaghty	Ballinrobe
Summerhill North	258	Kilmaine	Mayo	Ballinrobe
Summerhill South	437	Kilmaine	Mayo	Ballinrobe
Surgeview (or Nakil)	221	Erris	Kilmore	Belmullet
**Swineford**	Town	Gallen	Kilconduff	Swineford
Swineford	95	Gallen	Kilconduff	Swineford
Tagheen East	94	Clanmorris	Tagheen	Claremorris
Tagheen West	83	Clanmorris	Tagheen	Claremorris
Tallagh	1,429	Erris	Kilmore	Belmullet
Tallagh	1,750	Erris	Kilcommon	Newport
Tallavbaun	524	Murrisk	Kilgeever	Westport
Tallavbaun Island	11	Murrisk	Kilgeever	Westport
Tangincartoor	234	Murrisk	Oughaval	Westport
Tarsaghaun Beg North	948	Erris	Kilcommon	Newport
Tarsaghaun Beg South	822	Erris	Kilcommon	Newport
Tarsaghaun More	5,439	Erris	Kilcommon	Belmullet
Tavraun	1,127	Costello	Kilmovee	Swineford
Tawnagh	80	Clanmorris	Kilcolman	Claremorris
Tawnagh	66	Burrishoole	Aghagower	Westport
Tawnagh	185	Costello	Bekan	Claremorris
Tawnagh	58	Kilmaine	Kilmainemore	Ballinrobe
Tawnagh	557	Carra	Ballyovey	Ballinrobe
Tawnagh	60	Costello	Aghamore	Swineford
Tawnagh	511	Tirawley	Addergoole	Castlebar
Tawnagh	95	Clanmorris	Tagheen	Claremorris
Tawnagh Beg	1,033	Gallen	Templemore	Castlebar
Tawnagh East	243	Kilmaine	Kilmainemore	Ballinrobe
Tawnagh More	307	Gallen	Templemore	Castlebar
Tawnaghaknaff	155	Gallen	Bohola	Swineford
Tawnaghbaun	170	Kilmaine	Kilcommon	Ballinrobe
Tawnaghbeg	832	Costello	Kilbeagh	Swineford
Tawnaghlahard	259	Clanmorris	Kilcolman	Claremorris
Tawnaghmore	463	Costello	Bekan	Claremorris
Tawnaghmore	457	Tirawley	Kilbelfad	Ballina
Tawnaghmore	1,813	Erris	Kilcommon	Belmullet
Tawnaghmore Lower	266	Tirawley	Killala	Killala
Tawnaghmore Upper	120	Tirawley	Killala	Killala
Tawnaghs	709	Tirawley	Crossmolina	Ballina
Tawnaglass	200	Gallen	Kilconduff	Swineford
Tawnagrania	596	Burrishoole	Burrishoole	Newport
Tawnakeel	388	Tirawley	Crossmolina	Ballina
Tawnamartola	115	Burrishoole	Burrishoole	Newport
Tawnamullagh	83	Gallen	Kilconduff	Swineford
Tawnanameeltoge	104	Burrishoole	Burrishoole	Newport
Tawnanasheffin	795	Erris	Kilcommon	Newport
Tawnanasool	1,567	Erris	Kilcommon	Belmullet
Tawnawoggaun	191	Burrishoole	Burrishoole	Newport
Tawnyaboil	451	Tirawley	Doonfeeny	Killala
Tawnyagry	499	Carra	Ballintober	Castlebar
Tawnyard	682	Murrisk	Oughaval	Westport
Tawnycoolawee	152	Carra	Aglish	Castlebar
Tawnycrower	945	Murrisk	Oughaval	Westport
Tawnydoogan	751	Murrisk	Kilgeever	Westport
Tawnyeeny	703	Carra	Islandeady	Castlebar
Tawnyemon	145	Burrishoole	Kilmaclasser	Westport
Tawnyinah Lower	282	Costello	Kilbeagh	Swineford
Tawnyinah Middle	397	Costello	Kilbeagh	Swineford
Tawnyinah Upper	627	Costello	Kilbeagh	Swineford
Tawnyinlough	723	Murrisk	Kilgeever	Westport
Tawnykinaff	813	Carra	Turlough	Castlebar
Tawnylaheen	411	Carra	Aglish	Castlebar
Tawnylaheen	20	Carra	Turlough	Castlebar
Tawnylough	496	Clanmorris	Mayo	Claremorris
Tawnymacken	501	Murrisk	Kilgeever	Westport
Tawnynahulty	1,249	Tirawley	Doonfeeny	Killala
Tawnynameeltoge (or Midgefield)	209	Murrisk	Aghagower	Westport
Tawnynoran	1,117	Murrisk	Kilgeever	Westport
Tawnyshane	408	Carra	Turlough	Castlebar
Tawnyslinnaun	747	Murrisk	Oughaval	Westport
Tawnywaddyduff	1,352	Tirawley	Moygawnagh	Killala
Teevaloughan	903	Burrishoole	Burrishoole	Newport
Teevenacroaghy	817	Murrisk	Oughaval	Westport
Teevinish East	775	Burrishoole	Aghagower	Westport
Teevinish West	784	Burrishoole	Aghagower	Westport
Teevmore	156	Burrishoole	Burrishoole	Newport
Teevnabinnia	321	Murrisk	Kilgeever	Westport
Temple	200	Costello	Kilbeagh	Swineford
Termon	1,033	Erris	Kilmore	Belmullet
**Termoncarragh**	Town	Erris	Kilmore	Belmullet
Termoncarragh	618	Erris	Kilmore	Belmullet
Terrybaun	303	Tirawley	Addergoole	Castlebar
Terryduff	693	Tirawley	Addergoole	Castlebar
**The Neale**	Town	Kilmaine	Kilmolara	Ballinrobe
Thick Island	1	Kilmaine	Ballinchalla	Ballinrobe
Thomastown	319	Kilmaine	Kilcommon	Ballinrobe
Thomastown	168	Kilmaine	Kilmainemore	Ballinrobe
Thomastown (or Rusheen)	212	Carra	Drum	Castlebar
Thornhill	307	Murrisk	Oughaval	Westport
Tiraninny	302	Gallen	Killasser	Swineford
Tiraun	436	Erris	Kilmore	Belmullet
Tober	149	Costello	Aghamore	Swineford
Tobermore	313	Tirawley	Crossmolina	Ballina
Tobernadarry	182	Kilmaine	Moorgagagh	Ballinrobe
Tobernashee	104	Kilmaine	Kilmolara	Ballinrobe
Tobernaveen	768	Tirawley	Addergoole	Castlebar
Toberrooaun	543	Burrishoole	Aghagower	Westport
Togher	162	Costello	Bekan	Claremorris
Togher	556	Kilmaine	Robeen	Ballinrobe
Tomboholla	670	Costello	Kilbeagh	Swineford
Tonacarton	77	Kilmaine	Mayo	Ballinrobe
Tonacrock	319	Tirawley	Addergoole	Castlebar
Tonaderrew	229	Carra	Ballintober	Castlebar
Tonaleeaun	69	Kilmaine	Cong	Ballinrobe
Tonamace	218	Erris	Kilmore	Belmullet
Tonamace Common	18	Erris	Kilmore	Belmullet
Tonaraha East	29	Burrishoole	Kilmeena	Westport
Tonaraha West	69	Burrishoole	Kilmeena	Westport
Tonatanvally	2,068	Burrishoole	Achill	Newport
Tonatleva	954	Murrisk	Kilgeever	Westport
Tonbaun	47	Carra	Ballintober	Castlebar
Tonlegee	755	Burrishoole	Aghagower	Westport
Tonmore	297	Erris	Kilmore	Belmullet
Tonnagh	499	Costello	Kilbeagh	Swineford
Tonranny	178	Murrisk	Aghagower	Westport
Tonree	97	Tirawley	Moygawnagh	Killala
Tonregee	346	Costello	Kilcolman	Castlereagh
Tonregee	372	Costello	Annagh	Claremorris
Tonregee East	762	Burrishoole	Achill	Newport
Tonregee West	566	Burrishoole	Achill	Newport
Tonroe	65	Gallen	Kilconduff	Swineford
Tonroe	240	Costello	Kilbeagh	Swineford
Tonroe Lower	125	Tirawley	Rathreagh	Killala
Tonroe Upper	108	Tirawley	Rathreagh	Killala
Tonybaun	293	Tirawley	Ballynahaglish	Ballina
Toobrackan	744	Costello	Kilcolman	Castlereagh
Toocananagh	1,266	Gallen	Bohola	Swineford
Toomanagh	151	Costello	Castlemore	Castlereagh
Toomore	302	Gallen	Toomore	Swineford
Tooracappul	21	Tirawley	Templemurry	Killala
Toorard	408	Kilmaine	Shrule	Ballinrobe
Toorard	114	Gallen	Killasser	Swineford
Tooraree	410	Costello	Bekan	Claremorris
Toorbuck	164	Burrishoole	Aghagower	Westport
Tooreen	53	Murrisk	Kilgeever	Westport
Tooreen	153	Tirawley	Templemurry	Killala
Tooreen	203	Costello	Aghamore	Swineford
Tooreen	503	Tirawley	Crossmolina	Ballina
Tooreen	353	Carra	Ballyovey	Ballinrobe
Tooreenphilip	111	Tirawley	Ballysakeery	Ballina
Toorgarve	114	Burrishoole	Kilmaclasser	Westport
Toorglass	383	Erris	Kilcommon	Belmullet
Toormakeady East	200	Carra	Ballyovey	Ballinrobe
Toormakeady Mountain	1,051	Carra	Ballyovey	Ballinrobe
Toormakeady West	104	Carra	Ballyovey	Ballinrobe
Toormore East	261	Carra	Turlough	Castlebar
Toormore West	194	Carra	Turlough	Castlebar
Tooromin	509	Gallen	Bohola	Swineford
Tootagh	278	Clanmorris	Kilcolman	Claremorris
Towerhill Demesne	340	Carra	Touaghty	Ballinrobe
Townplots East	25	Tirawley	Killala	Killala
Townplots West	581	Tirawley	Killala	Killala
Treanacally (or Hagfield)	860	Costello	Kilbeagh	Swineford
Treanbeg	725	Burrishoole	Burrishoole	Newport
Treanfohanaun	574	Gallen	Bohola	Swineford
Treangarrow	146	Tirawley	Kilfian	Ballina
Treangarve	199	Clanmorris	Crossboyne	Claremorris
Treankeel	262	Gallen	Killedan	Swineford
Treanlaur	117	Gallen	Attymass	Ballina
Treanlaur	400	Gallen	Kilconduff	Swineford
Treanlaur	383	Carra	Ballyovey	Ballinrobe
Treanlaur	923	Burrishoole	Burrishoole	Newport
Treannagleragh	1,115	Gallen	Killedan	Swineford
Treannaskehy	181	Clanmorris	Kilvine	Claremorris
Treanoughter	277	Gallen	Attymass	Ballina
Treanrevagh	50	Costello	Bekan	Claremorris
Treanrevagh	338	Gallen	Killasser	Swineford
Treanybrogaun	285	Carra	Turlough	Castlebar
Tree island	1	Carra	Islandeady	Castlebar
Treel	1,634	Burrishoole	Burrishoole	Newport
Treenagh	329	Tirawley	Kilfian	Killala
Tristia	3,495	Erris	Kilcommon	Belmullet
Tristia	1,355	Tirawley	Crossmolina	Ballina
Trouthill (or Knockbrack)	200	Costello	Kilbeagh	Swineford
Tubbrid Beg	1,346	Tirawley	Crossmolina	Ballina
Tubbrid More	1,110	Tirawley	Crossmolina	Ballina
Tullaghanbaun	597	Erris	Kilcommon	Belmullet
Tullaghanduff	1,283	Erris	Kilcommon	Belmullet
Tullaghanmore (or Edmondstown Desmene)	440	Costello	Kilcolman	Castlereagh
Tullaghanrock	668	Costello	Kilcolman	Castlereagh
Tullaghaun	207	Costello	Annagh	Claremorris
Tullaghaunna-hammer	848	Erris	Kilcommon	Belmullet
Tullanacorra	411	Gallen	Kilconduff	Swineford
Tulleague	212	Gallen	Killasser	Swineford
Tully	119	Carra	Drum	Castlebar
Tully	327	Murrisk	Kilgeever	Westport
Tully	202	Carra	Aglish	Castlebar
Tully Commons	437	Carra	Aglish	Castlebar
Tully More	282	Clanmorris	Balla	Castlebar
Tullybeg	64	Carra	Drum	Castlebar
Tullybeg	114	Clanmorris	Balla	Castlebar
Tullybeg Glebe	24	Clanmorris	Mayo	Claremorris
Tullyduff	155	Kilmaine	Kilmainemore	Ballinrobe
Tullyegan	113	Tirawley	Kilmoremoy	Ballina
Tullyganny	319	Costello	Kilmovee	Swineford
Tullynahoo	743	Gallen	Kilconduff	Swineford
Tullyroe	59	Gallen	Meelick	Swineford
Tullysleva	284	Tirawley	Kilbelfad	Ballina
Tulrohaun	47	Costello	Annagh	Claremorris
Tumgesh	687	Gallen	Killasser	Swineford
Turin	389	Kilmaine	Kilmainemore	Ballinrobe
Turlough	240	Carra	Turlough	Castlebar
Turlough	151	Costello	Bekan	Claremorris
Turloughanbaun	94	Kilmaine	Kilmainemore	Ballinrobe
Uggool	3,204	Erris	Kilcommon	Belmullet
Uggool	821	Costello	Kilmovee	Swineford
Uggool	584	Murrisk	Kilgeever	Westport
Ummerantarry	1,104	Tirawley	Kilfian	Killala
Ummoon	376	Gallen	Templemore	Swineford
Urlaur	1,714	Costello	Kilmovee	Swineford
Walshpool	311	Carra	Drum	Castlebar
Weatherfort	292	Carra	Rosslee	Ballinrobe
Westland	263	Carra	Ballyhean	Castlebar
**Westport**	Town	Murrisk	Oughaval	Westport
Westport Demesne	272	Murrisk	Oughaval	Westport
Westport Demesne	1,070	Burrishoole	Kilmeena	Westport
**Westport Quay**	Town	Murrisk	Oughaval	Westport
Westquarter	493	Murrisk	Inishbofin	Clifden
Wherrew	74	Tirawley	Kilbelfad	Ballina
Whitepark	96	Carra	Touaghty	Ballinrobe
Wilford	13	Burrishoole	Burrishoole	Newport
Windsor (or Breandrum)	215	Carra	Breaghwy	Castlebar
Woodfield	338	Costello	Aghamore	Swineford
Woodpark	172	Costello	Annagh	Claremorris
Woods	549	Gallen	Killedan	Swineford
Woods	476	Gallen	Kilconduff	Swineford
Woodstock	409	Clanmorris	Crossboyne	Claremorris
Woodville	324	Tirawley	Kilfian	Ballina
