= James Reuter =

20th and 21st-century American-Filipino Jesuit priest (1916-2012)

The Reverend James B. Reuter SJ, BLD
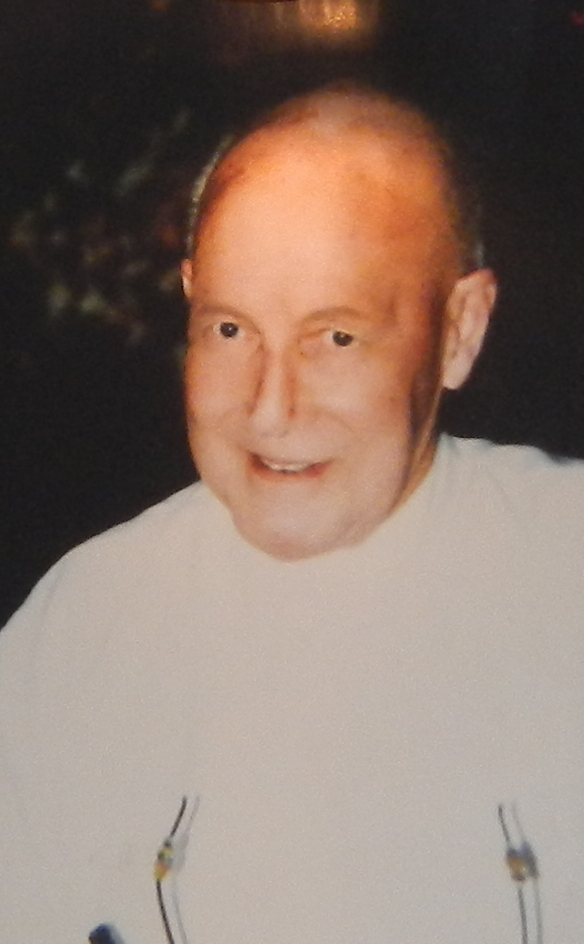

Orders
- Ordination: Woodstock College, Woodstock, Maryland, U.S.

Personal details
- Born: James Bertram Reuter; May 21, 1916 Elizabeth, New Jersey, U.S.
- Died: December 31, 2012 (aged 96) Parañaque, Philippines
- Denomination: Roman Catholicism
- Occupation: Theatre, journalist, television director, educator, writer
- Education: Fordham University, 1947

James Bertram Reuter SJ BLD (/ˈrɔɪtər/ ROY-tərz; May 21, 1916 – December 31, 2012) was an American Jesuit Catholic priest who lived in the Philippines since he was 22 and taught at Ateneo de Manila University. He was a well-known public figure who was a writer, director and producer in theatre, radio, print and film. He was also a prominent figure in the resistance against the two-decade rule of President Ferdinand Marcos, and played a key role in the 1986 People Power Revolution that overthrew Marcos. He educated and trained students in creative works, inspired by the works of Christ, instilling the importance of prayers most especially the Holy Rosary, working alongside and continuing the mission of the Rev. Patrick Peyton, best known as the "Rosary Priest".

Reuter received awards and recognition for promoting the Catholic Church through mass media, including the award for "Outstanding Service to the Catholic Church in the field of Mass Media", personally given to him in January 1981 by Pope John Paul II. For his work in the field of communication, and training prominent leaders and artists in Philippine society, he was made an "honorary citizen of the Philippines"; in 1984 by the Batasang Pambansa, in 1996 by both chambers of the Congress.

Reuter later retired to the Xavier House in Santa Ana, Manila, before he was transferred to the Our Lady of Peace Hospital in Parañaque, where he remained until his death on New Year's Eve 2012.

== Biography ==
=== Early life and education ===
Reuter was born in Elizabeth, New Jersey, and attended St. Peter's Preparatory School in Jersey City, New Jersey, graduating in 1934. He was a seminarian at the Jesuit formation house of St. Isaac Jogues in Wernersville, Pennsylvania.

=== Arrival and the Second World War ===
Reuter first came to the Commonwealth of the Philippines at the age of 22, remaining in the country for almost his entire life. During the Japanese Occupation, members of the Society of Jesus were placed in an internment camp in Los Baños, Laguna. He was the last surviving member of the camp. He returned to the United States following his liberation and was ordained into the priesthood at Woodstock, Maryland. After completing studies in radio and television communications at Fordham University, he returned to The Philippines in 1948 for his life's long work serving God and The Philippine people in communications and mass media.

=== Family Rosary Crusade ===
It was in 1947 when Reuter first heard of the rapidly growing mission of Patrick Peyton, of the Congregation of Holy Cross and promoted praying of the family rosary. Both Reuter and Peyton believed that the most effective means of propagating the word of Christ, the messages of the Blessed Virgin Mary was through the use of emerging mass communication with the likes of radio, film, and television. Reuter submitted an unsolicited short drama for radio to Peyton in 1947 and it was used in the weekly broadcasts of the Family Theater radio shows that aired on the defunct American radio network Mutual Broadcasting System or MBS. The drama titled, "Stolen Symphony" was awarded as best drama by the Ohio State Awards.

Reuter returned to the Philippines in 1948, and on his own established Family Theater Productions, duplicating the efforts of Peyton in the United States, he solicited free radio airtime on radio station KZPI and got named Filipino actors and actresses to volunteer their voices and acting talent to dramatize family oriented soaps and the praying of the Rosary.

Reuter brought Family Theater to television in 1953, operating until the declaration of Martial Law on 23 September 1972, when media was forcibly shut and seized by the government of Ferdinand Marcos.

=== During the Marcos dictatorship ===
During the 14 year period of Ferdinand Marcos' authoritarian rule in the Philippines (which included the Martial Law period from 1972 to 1981, and the succeeding period in which Marcos lifted the formal declaration of Martial Law but retained most of his powers), Reuter was director of communication for the Jesuits in the Philippines, as well as the Catholic Bishops Conference of the Philippines From his offices in the Jesuits' Xavier House facility on Herran Street (now Pedro Gil) in Manila, he spearheaded the publication of "Signs of the Times", and worked to keep Catholic radio stations going, raising concerns about the abuses of the Marcos dictatorship. He also visited political detainees in the various Martial Law "detention centers" (which the administration did not call prisons), and pleaded with diplomats for the west to stop supporting Marcos' administration.

Eventually, however, he was arrested and tried by the Marcos administration and then released under a vague amnesty. During the People Power Revolution, he was a key player in making sure that the Catholic AM station Radio Veritas, which was keeping the civilian demonstrators on EDSA updated about Marcos forces' movements, stayed on the air - even when government snipers managed to bring down Radio Veritas' initial broadcast transmission site.

=== Broadcast work after the People Power Revolution ===
With the restoration of democracy in 1986 and the establishment of the Fifth Philippine Republic, Reuter returned to television with a magazine-talk show programme, Family Rosary Crusade, that aired on ABS-CBN. Reuter served as the spiritual guide to the programme's weekly episodes, and until his death hosted another daily 3-minute reflection program on ABC5 called "Three Minutes a Day".

=== Jesuit Communications ===
In 1968, Reuter and two fellow Jesuits founded the Philippine chapter of the Jesuits Engaged in Social Communications or JESCOM. Initially, the group served as the communications arm of the Society's Philippine province. JESCOM took part in rural evangelization with the production of radio soap serials and comics with storylines that appeal to rural communities.

=== Prisoner ministry cases ===
He served as the spiritual adviser to American Marine Lance Corporal Daniel Smith, an accused in the highly controversial Subic rape case.

=== Death and funeral ===
The Catholic Bishops' Conference of the Philippines officially announced Reuter's death at 12:51 PST (UTC+08:00) at the church-run Our Lady of Peace Hospital along Coastal Road in Parañaque. He had earlier suffered a mild stroke after staying in the hospital for the last three years.

Reuter's casket lay in repose at St. Paul University Manila on January 3, 2013, and was transferred to Church of the Gesù inside the Ateneo de Manila University's Katipunan campus. As per custom, his casket was laid feet facing the congregation to reflect his life's status as a priest ministering to the faithful. A vigil Mass was said by Noel Vasquez, with Asandas Balchand preaching the sermon; the next day, Catalino Arevalo and Joaquin Bernas also said Mass, with a combined choir from the Ateneo de Manila College Glee Club, Bukas Palad Music Ministry, and Ateneo College Ministry Group.

The Requiem Mass for Reuter was held at 08:30 PST on January 5, 2013, said by Cardinal Luis Antonio Tagle, Archbishop of Manila, Jose Cecilio Magadia, with Bienvenido Nebres as homilist, with the Reuter's Glee Club as the choir. The interment followed at Sacred Heart Novitiate in Novaliches, Quezon City at 11:00, where Reuter was buried along with other Jesuit priests and seminarians.

Reuter founded the Foundation of Our Lady of Peace Mission Inc. and directed live on stage presentation of Family Theater in the Philippines, the Family Rosary Crusade.

=== Funeral service ===
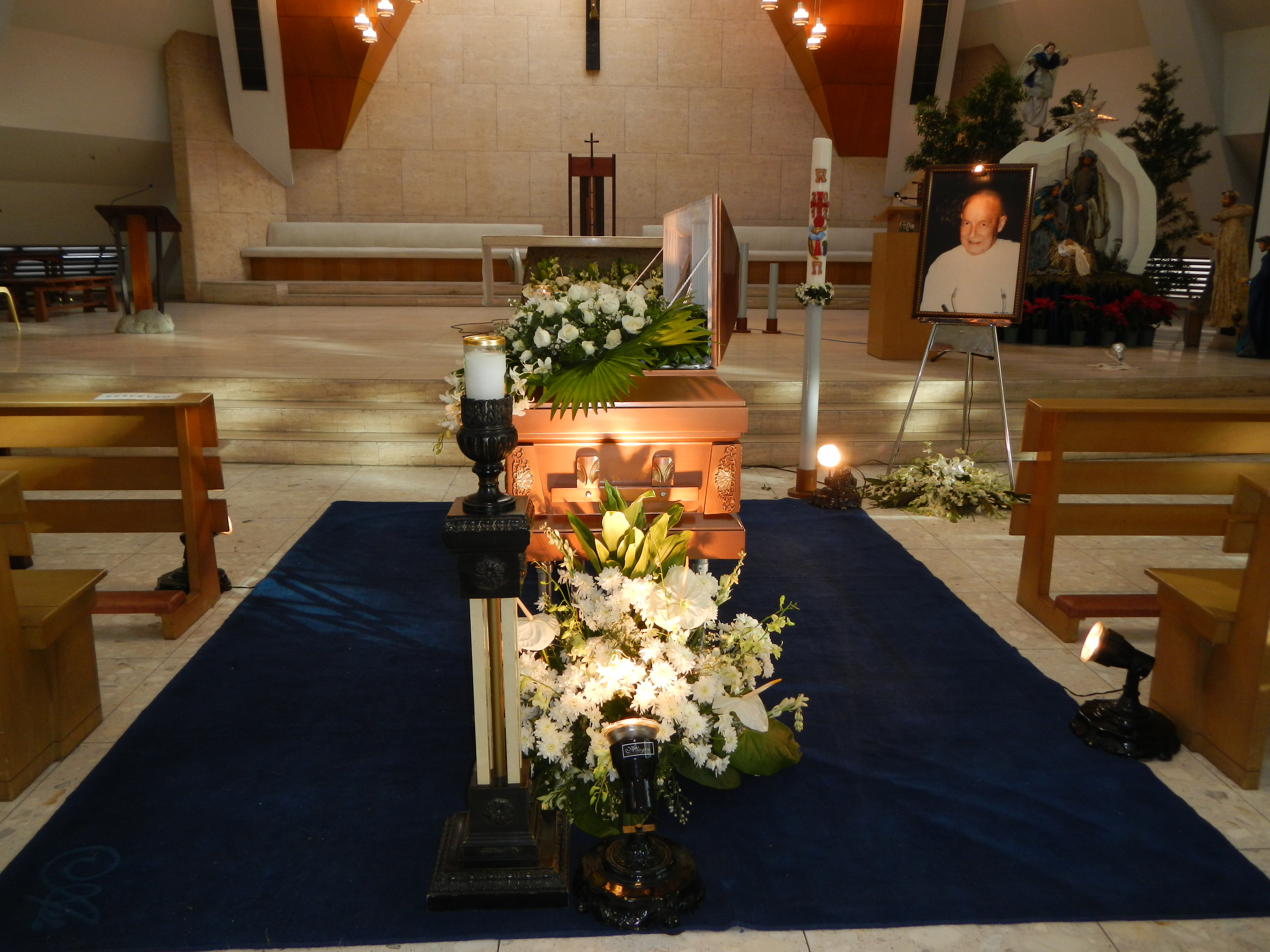
Casket near the sanctuary of the Church of the Gesù.

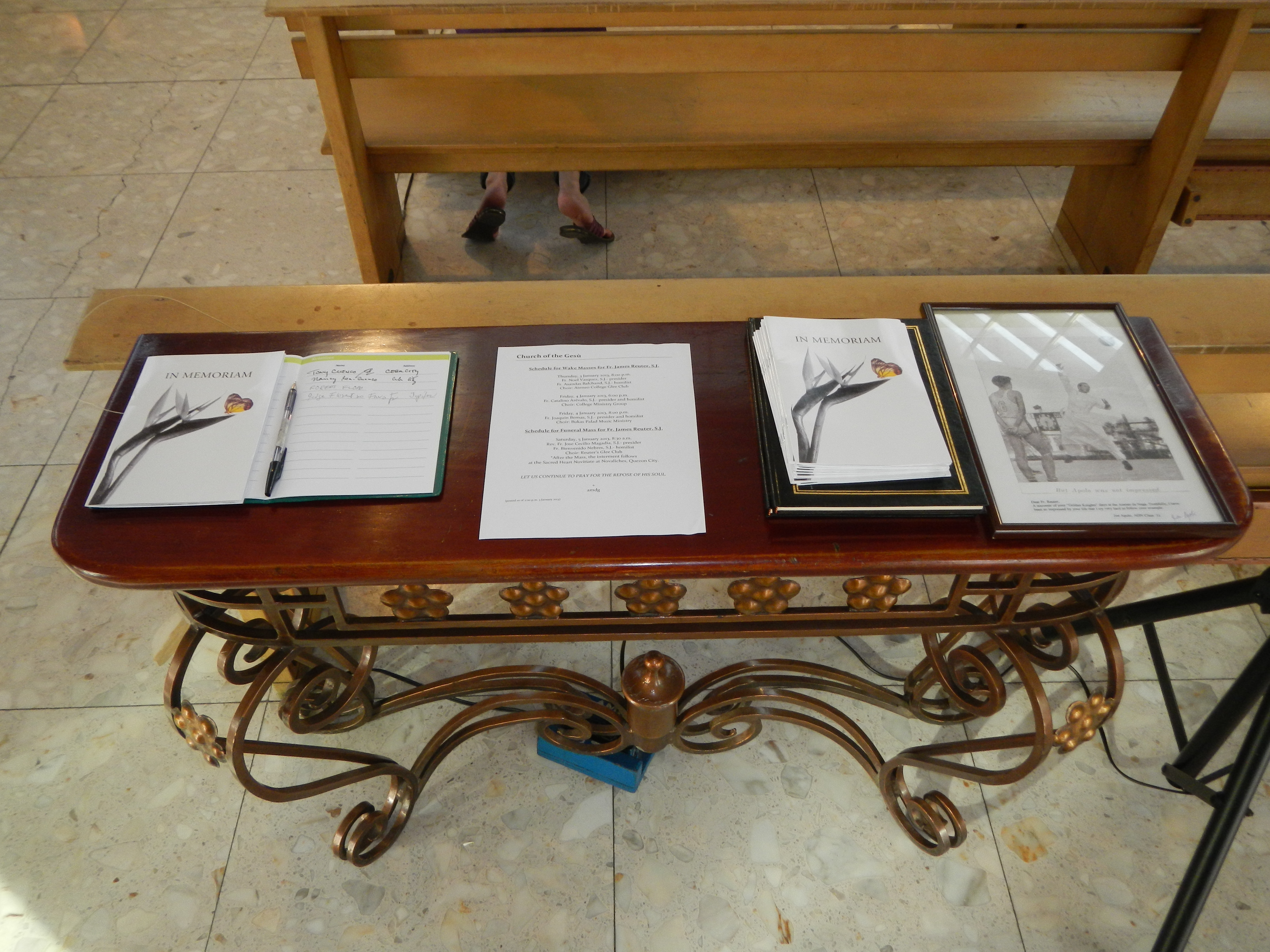
The book of condolences and schedule of memorial services

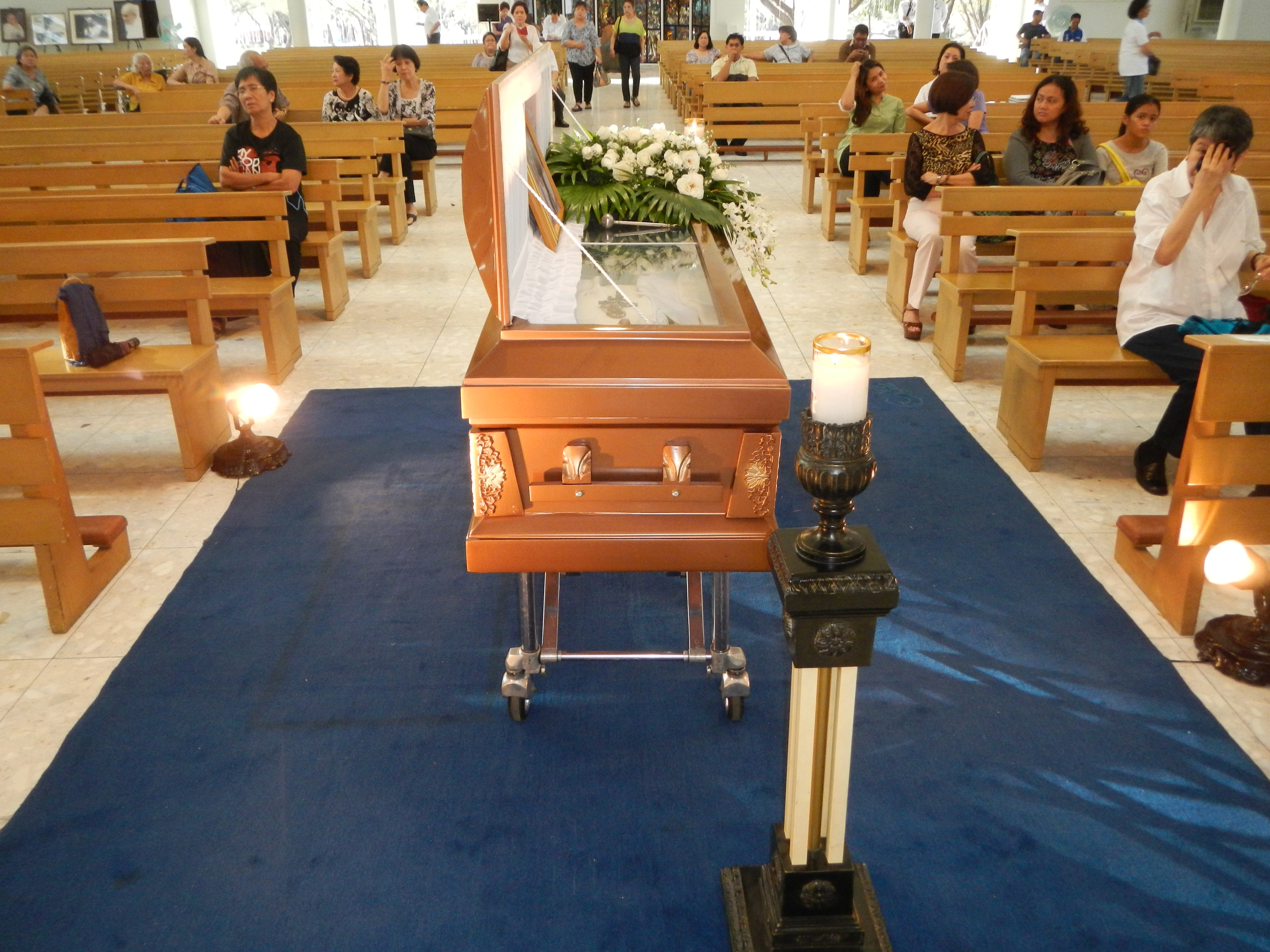
Reuter's casket at his funeral

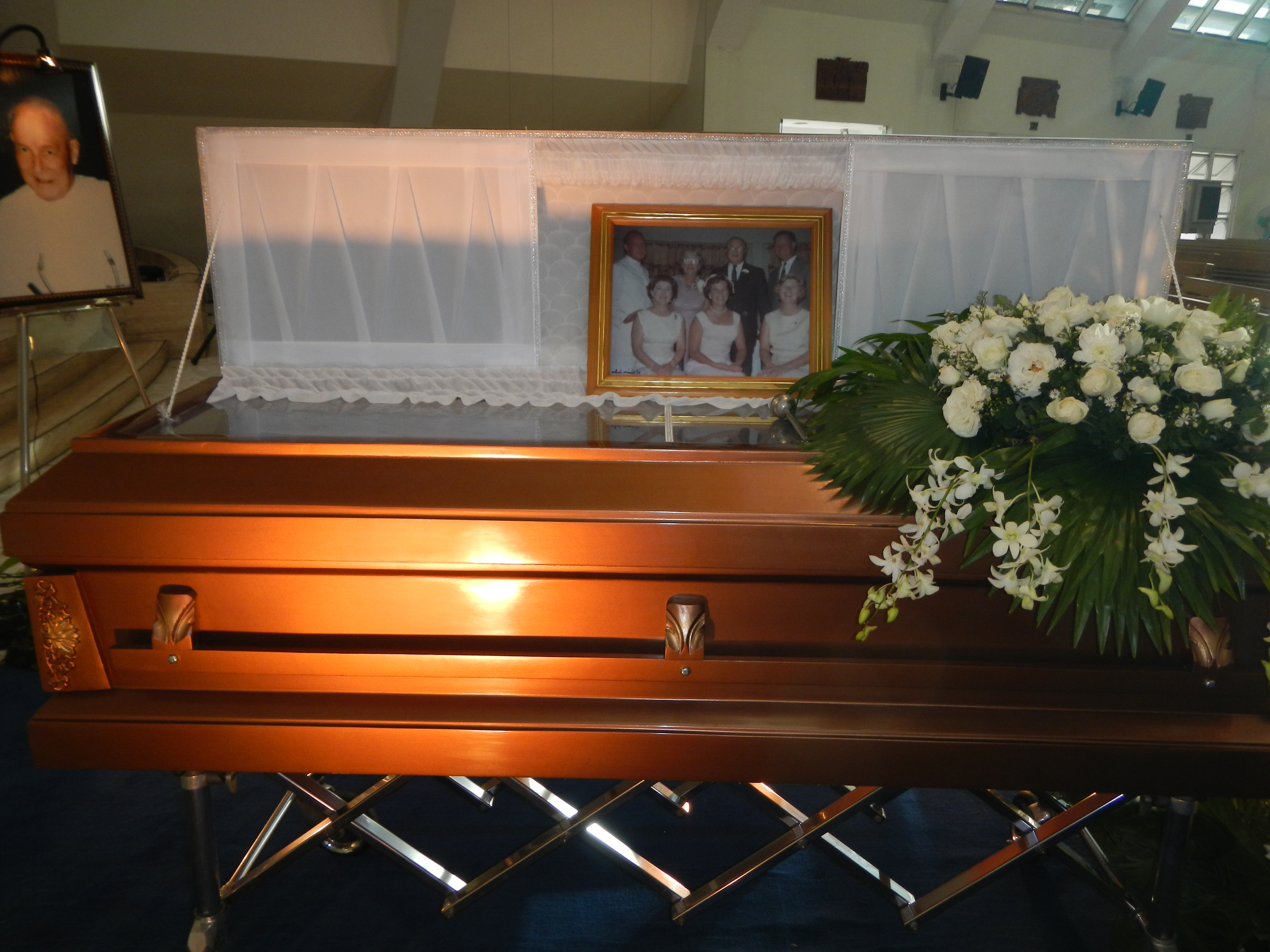
Photos of Reuter's relatives on his open casket

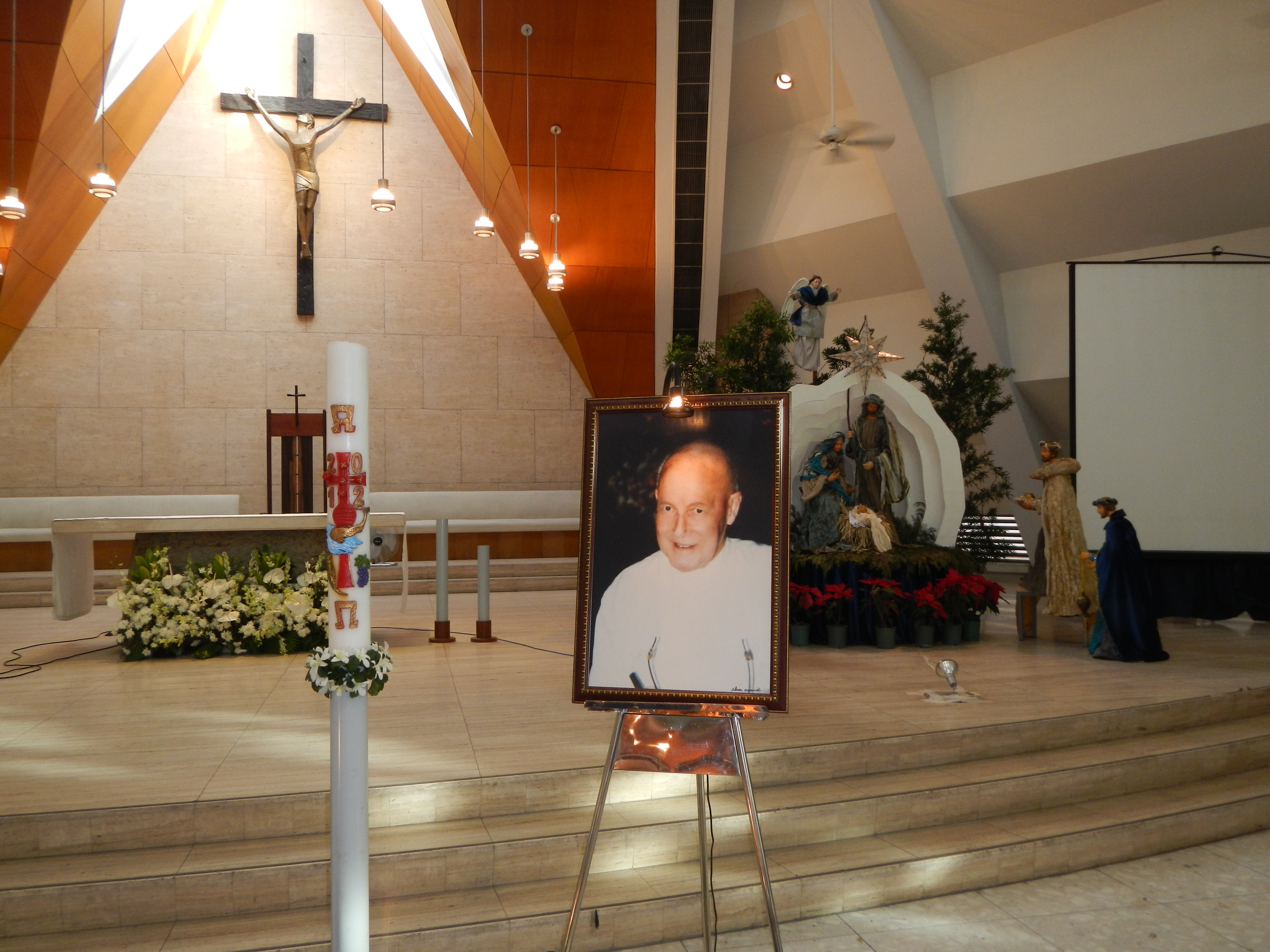
Funerary portrait of Reuter beside the Paschal candle

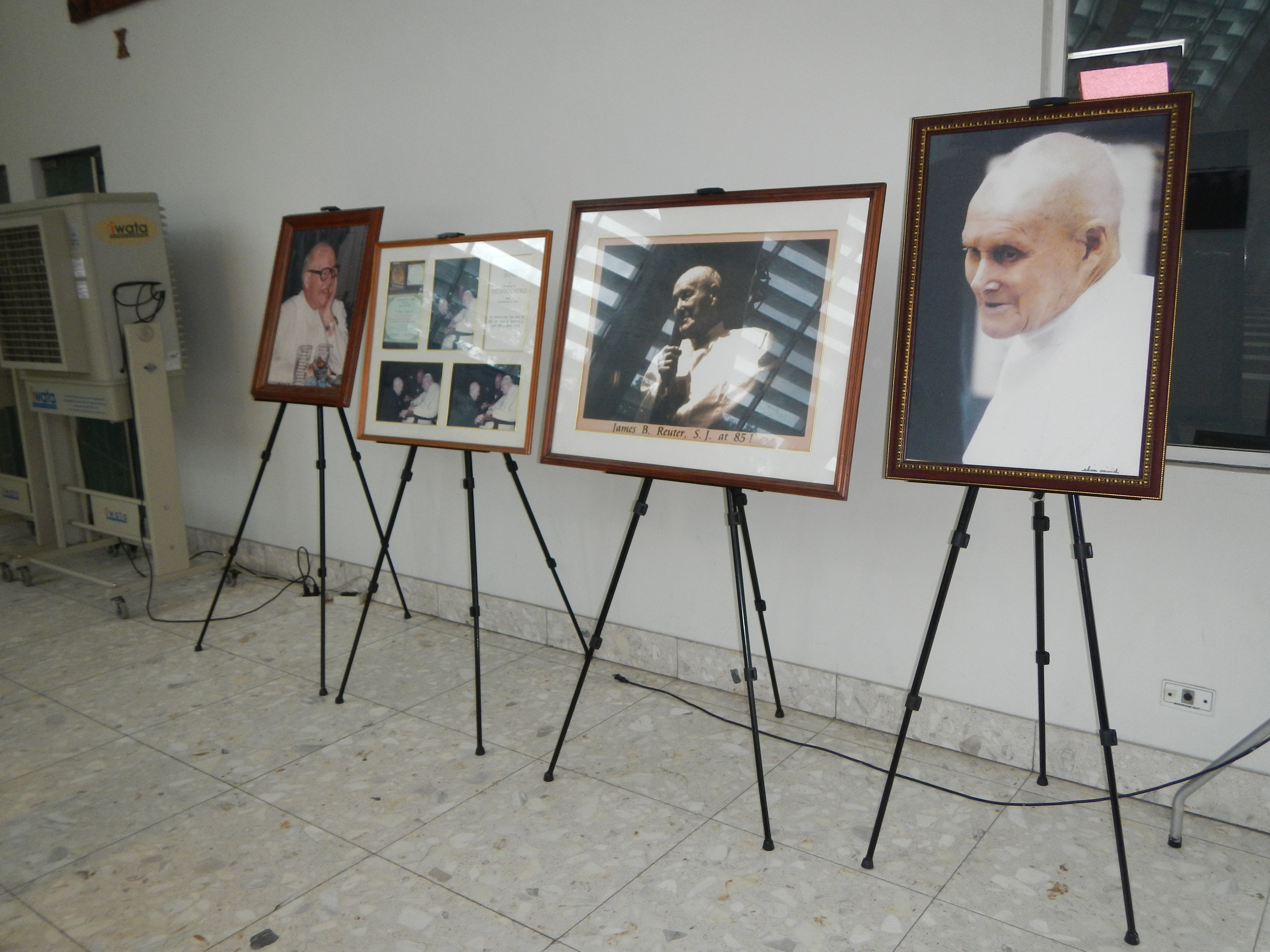
Photo gallery near the narthex of the church

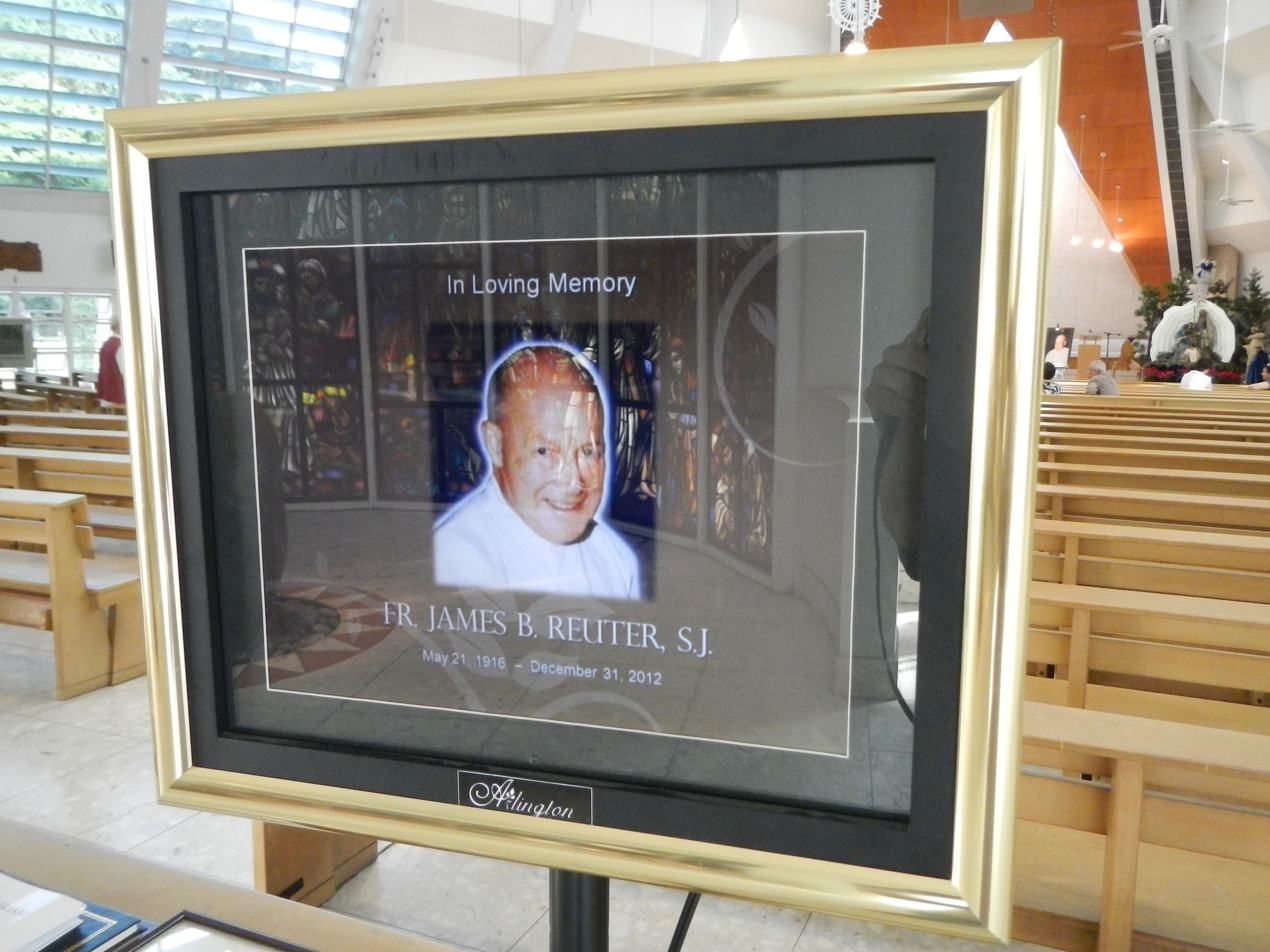
Announcement of interment

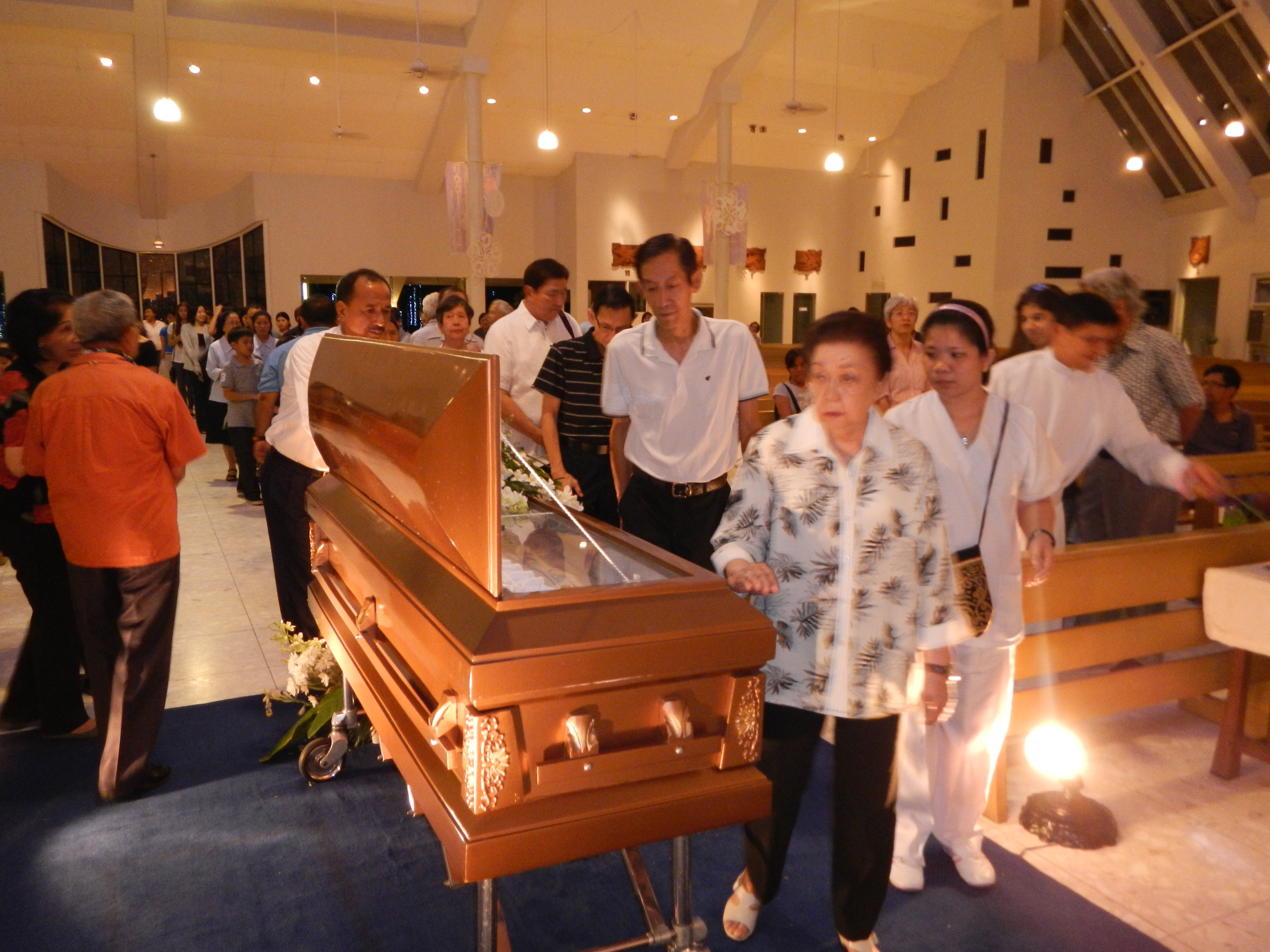
Final viewing on January 4, 2013

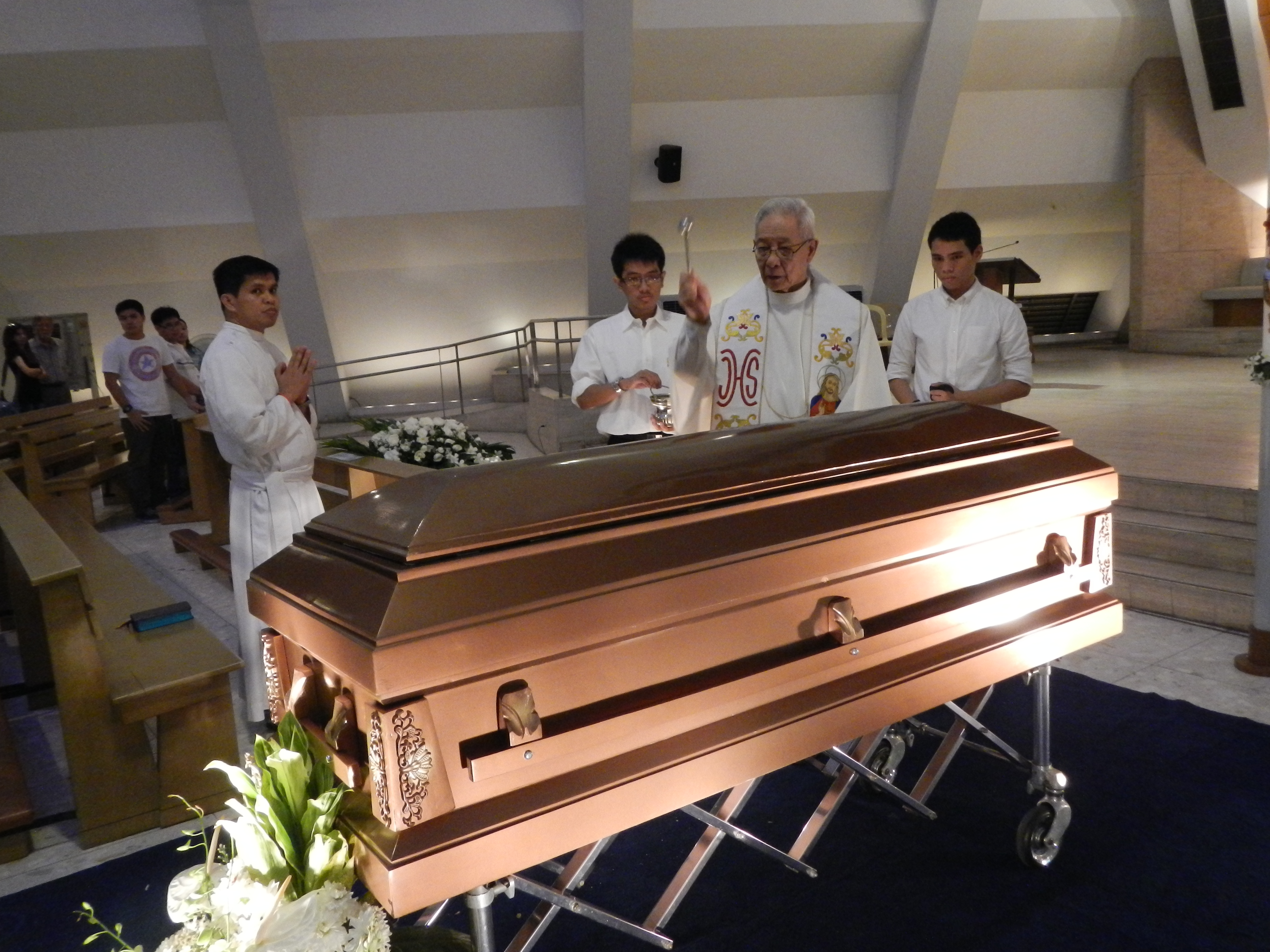
Catalino G. Arevalo blessing the casket at the Requiem Mass

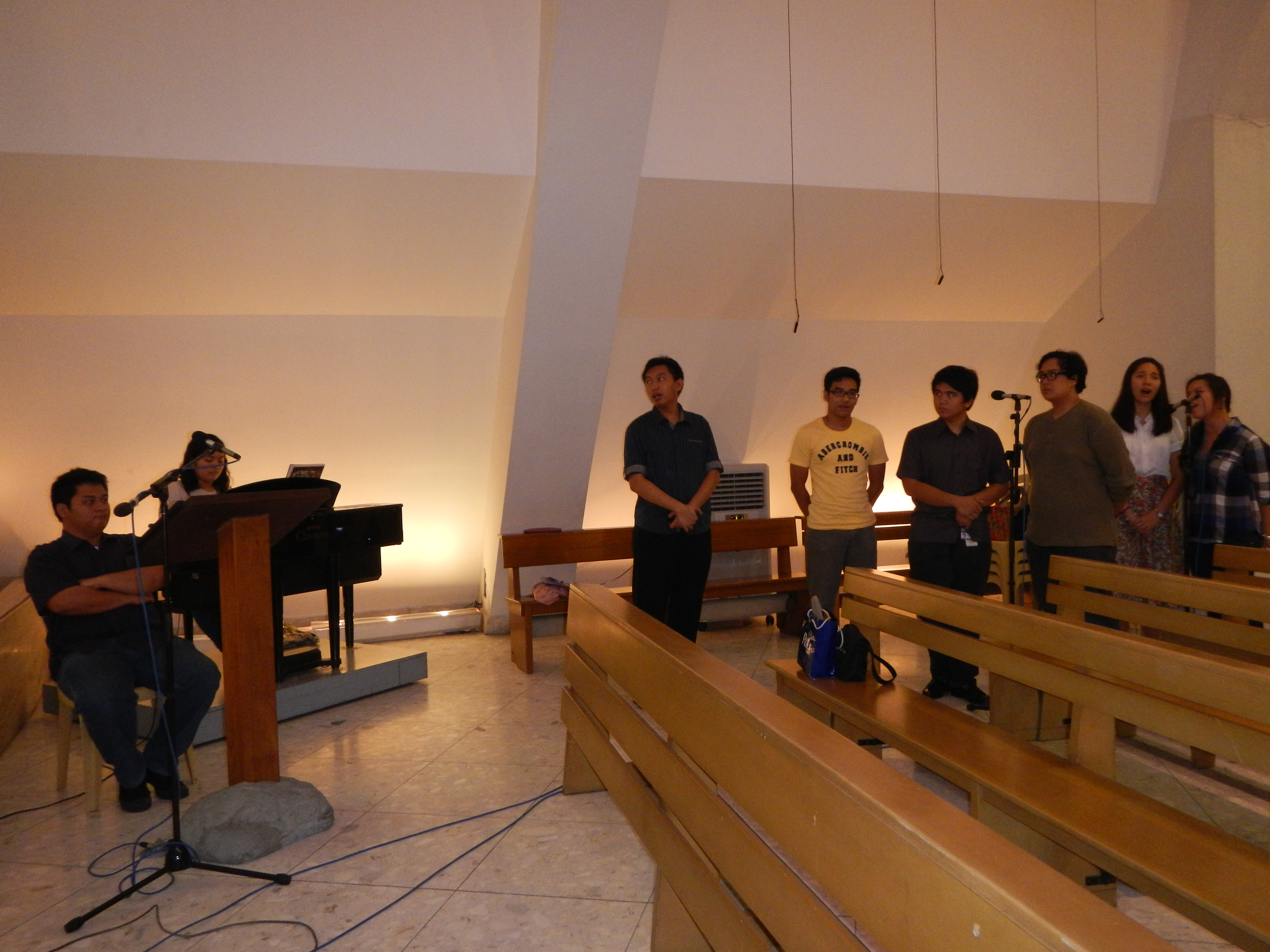
The Reuter's Glee Club singing at the funeral

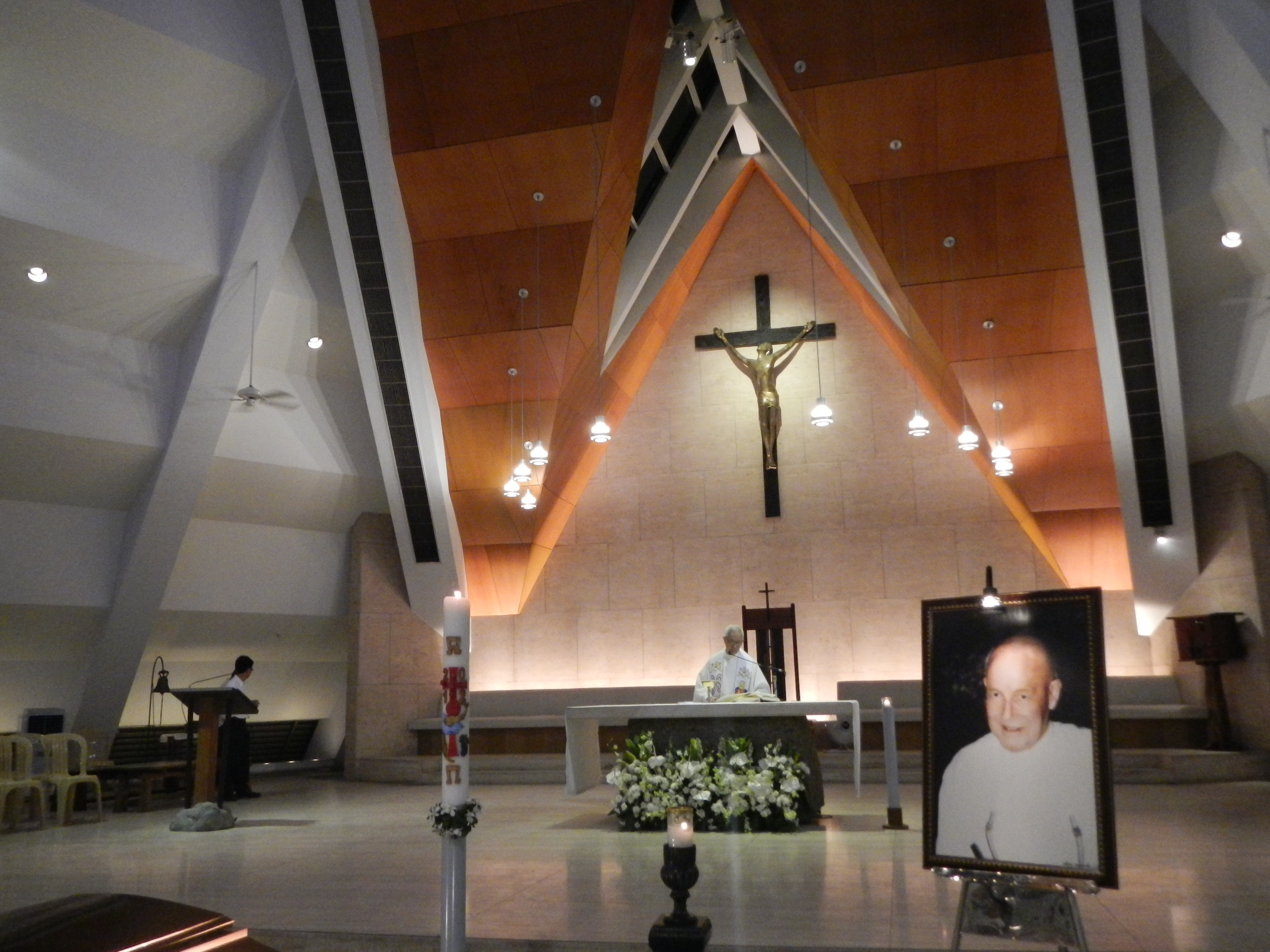
First Friday Mass by Catalino G. Arevalo
