= Fu Jen Faculty of Theology of St. Robert Bellarmine =

Catholic theological seminary in Taiwan

- Former names: St. Robert Bellarmine Theological Seminary, Fu Jen Catholic University Theological Seminary
- Type: Catholic seminary
- Established: 1929 in Shanghai
- Affiliations: Holy See (Dicastery for Culture and Education), Taiwan Christian Universities and Colleges Alliance
- Religious affiliation: The Catholic Church
- President: Father Cui Baochen (崔寶臣, August 2024 – present)
- Location: No. 103, Lane 514, Zhongzheng Road, Xinzhuang District, New Taipei City, Republic of China (Taiwan)
- Campus: Suburban
- Website: theology.catholic.org.tw

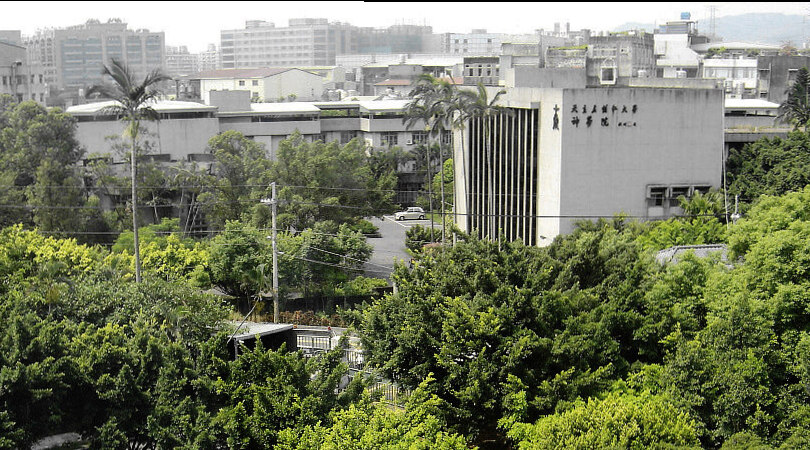
A distant view of St. Bellarmine Seminary from Fu Jen Catholic University

Fu Jen Faculty of Theology of St. Robert Bellarmine (Chinese: 輔仁聖博敏神學院), abbreviated as Fu Jen Seminary or St. Bellarmine Seminary, is a Christian institution located in Xinzhuang District, New Taipei City, Taiwan. It is currently the only Catholic theological seminary in Taiwan and the only Catholic seminary in the world which is directly affiliated with the Divine Congregation for Culture and Education and conducts teaching and research in Chinese. The school is also a member of the International Association of Jesuit Universities.

Founded as the "St. Robert Bellarmine Theological Seminary" by the Society of Jesus in 1929 in Shanghai, the school is now a large seminary authorized to confer Baccalaureate, Licentiate, and Doctorate degrees.

== History ==
1929: The Society of Jesus Chinese Province and the Sacred Congregation of Seminary and University Studies founded the "St. Robert Bellarmine Theological Seminary" in Xujiahui, Shanghai, Republic of China. Its name commemorates the 16th-century Italian theologian, Robert Bellarmine. The school was also called "Xuhui Theological Seminary".

1932: With the approval of the Apostolic Congregation, the school was authorized to award Bachelor of Theology and Master of Theology degrees.

1952: Due to political changes, the school moved to Baguio City, Philippines. During its time in Shanghai and the Philippines, the school was specifically established to train Jesuit missionaries.

1967: The school moved from the Philippines to its current location in Xinzhuang Township, Taipei County, Taiwan (now Xinzhuang District, New Taipei City). On December 8th, the Society of Jesus signed an agreement with Fu Jen Catholic University, formally attaching the theological seminary to the university, and granting it permission to admit seminarians from various dioceses, members of various religious orders, and outstanding lay members to assist in training future generations. The school's name was changed to the "Fu Jen Catholic University Theological Seminary", abbreviated as "Fu Jen Theological Seminary". Nominally affiliated with Fu Jen Catholic University, its administration remained under the Society of Jesus.

In 1969, the journal "Collected Essays on Theology (神學論集)" was launched.

1985: Approval was granted by the Dicastery for Culture and Education to establish a doctoral program.

February 28, 1991: The statutes were revised in Chinese for the first time, and the Holy See's Congregation for Education approved them on February 28.

October 2002: The "Indigenous Theological Research Center" was established.

2011: The school was separated from Fu Jen Catholic University and became a theological seminary directly under the jurisdiction of the Vatican's Department of Education. Fu Jen Catholic University simultaneously launched the "Catholic Studies Bachelor of Science" program at the departmental level.

August 1, 2012: The school was renamed "Fu Jen Faculty of Theology of St. Robert Bellarmine" after its founding name.

2020: The institution's bylaws were amended for the third time, and the Catholic Diocese of Education approved them on July 31st. These are the current bylaws of the institution.

== Academic Units ==
- Undergraduate education
  - Department of Religious Sciences
    - Bachelor of Religious Sciences
  - Department of Theology
    - Bachelor of Sacred Theology
- Graduate School
  - Graduate School of Religious Sciences
    - Master of Religious Sciences
  - Graduate School of Theology
    - Master of Sacred Theology
    - Doctorate in Sacred Theology.
- Research Centers:
  - Center for Indigenous Theology Research,
  - Center for Bioethics Research,
  - Center for Liturgy Research,
  - Center for Evangelization Research

== Library ==
The Fu Jen Catholic Theological Seminary Library, also known as the "Chinese Jesuit Seminary Library," is owned by the Chinese Provincial Jesuit Society. It is available for use by the seminary's faculty and students, and is also open to Fu Jen Catholic University faculty and students for reference. Besides Christian texts, the library also collects books and related non-paper materials from other religions. The collection is available in at least eight different languages including English and Chinese. Its theological and other book collection is among the best among Catholic theological seminaries in Southeast Asia.

== Notable alumni ==
- Cardinal Shan Kuo-hsi: Retired Bishop of the Catholic Diocese of Kaohsiung, Former Bishop of the Catholic Diocese of Hualien, Chairman of the Board of Directors of Fu Jen Catholic University (Alumnus from Baguio, Philippines)
- Sun Hsiao-chih: Professor, Department of Philosophy, National Taiwan University
- Walis Perin: Legislator, Chairman of the Council of Indigenous Peoples, Executive Yuan
- Pu Hsiung-ying: Bishop of the Catholic Diocese of Chiayi

== Other information ==
- The school is authorized by the Dicastery for Culture and Education to confer Baccalaureate, Licentiate, and Doctorate degrees in Sacred Theology.
- The school is a member of the International Association of Jesuit Universities (IAJU) and of the Alliance of Taiwan Christian Universities and Colleges.
- The campus is located at: No.103, Ln. 514, Zhongzheng Rd., Xinzhuang District, 24255, New Taipei City, Taiwan, adjacent to the Fu Jen Catholic University.
- The school was originally established for the Jesuits, it now welcomes Jesuit and non-Jesuit students, including laypeople and religious individuals seeking theological education.

== See also ==
- International Association of Jesuit Universities
- Society of Jesus
- Fu Jen Catholic University
- Catholic Church in Taiwan
