= Eva Maamo =

Filipino nun and surgeon (1940–2026)

Personal life
- Born: Eva Fidela C. Maamo; September 17, 1940 Liloan, Leyte, Philippine Commonwealth
- Died: April 15, 2026 (aged 85) Parañaque, Metro Manila, Philippines
- Occupation: Nun, surgeon
- Honors: Ramon Magsaysay Award (1997)

Religious life
- Religion: Roman Catholicism
- Institute: Sisters of Saint Paul of Chartres
- Profession: Surgeon

Eva Fidela C. Maamo was a Filipino nun, missionary and surgeon and a recipient of the Ramon Magsaysay Award in 1997.

== Early life and education ==
Eva Fidela Maamo was born in September 17, 1940, in Liloan, Leyte (now Southern Leyte). Her father is a politician who was mayor of their town and was Vice Governor of Leyte while her mother is a teacher. She is the fifth eldest child among eleven children. Eva Maamo was inspired to become a nun when she was in second grade. Around this time, her family provide shelter to members of the Daughters of St. Paul.

She studied medicine at Velez College in Cebu City. After graduating she practiced medicine at a family clinic back in Liloan. Her family, especially her father was opposed to her aspiration to become a nun. They sent her to the United States to discourage her where she studied general surgery at the University of California Hospital.

== Work ==
=== Early years ===
Maamo became a nun and a missionary upon her return to the Philippines, joining the Sisters of Saint Paul of Chartres in 1974. Her first mission as a physician-nun was the Santa Cruz Mission in Lake Sebu in Mindanao, treating indigenous patients in a bamboo infirmary using improvised medical tools. She started her "barefoot doctor" training in Lake Sebu. This involved providing informal education to members of the indigenous communities on ways to treat common diseases.

=== Mission in Manila ===
In 1981, Maamo's superiors summoned her back to Manila. Maamo along with Jesuit priest James Reuter established the Foundation of Our Lady of Peace Mission in 1984 which provided various services such as free health clinics, livelihood programs, providing shelter to indigent children and abused women. In 1992, she helped established the Our Lady of Peace Hospital in Parañaque. The hospital building was inaugurated on August 15, 2003.

=== Pinatubo eruption and the Aeta community ===
Maamo provided help to the resettlement efforts of the Aeta following the aftermath of the 1991 Mount Pinatubo eruption. She helped resettle 146 families with 500 persons. Some later converted to Roman Catholicism. She claims not to "convert" but she said she has brought a catechist.

=== Continued works ===
In 2005, Maamo began inviting indigenous individuals to train as barefoot doctors in Manila. She reportedly trained 274 barefoot doctors from 110 indigenous communities throughout her life.

A 2019 ABS-CBN documentary reported that Maamo performs 300 to 400 surgeries per mission.

== Death ==
Maamo died on April 14, 2026 at the Our Lady of Peace Hospital in Parañaque. She was aged 85.

== Awards and recognition ==
Maamo was the recipient of the Mother Teresa Award conferred by the Manila Jaycees and the Alfonso Yuchengco Foundation in 1992.

The Ramon Magsaysay Award for Community Leadership was awarded to Maamo in 1997. She was also recogninzed as the Most Outstanding Physician of the Philippines Award in 1994, the International Peace Prize in 2003, and the Outstanding Woman of the 21st Century in 2003.
