= Ateneo de Manila University =

Private Catholic Jesuit university in Metro Manila, Philippines

- Pamantasang Ateneo de Manila (Filipino)
- University seal
- Latin: Ūniversitās Athēnaea Manīlēnsis
- Other name: The Ateneo
- Former names: Escuela Municipal de Manila (1859–1865); Ateneo Municipal de Manila (1865–1909); Ateneo de Manila (1909–1959)
- Motto: Lux in Domino
- Motto in English: Light in the Lord
- Type: Private, research, non-profit, coeducational basic and higher education institution
- Established: December 10, 1859 (166 years and 318 days)
- Founder: Society of Jesus
- Religious affiliation: Catholic Church (Jesuits)
Academic affiliations
ACUCA AJCU-AP AUN	PAASCU IAJU; JBEC
- Chairperson: Bernadine T. Siy
- President: Fr. Roberto C. Yap, SJ
- Academic staff: approx. 2,628 (2022)
- Administrative staff: 3,015 (2019)
- Students: 22,078 (2024)
- Undergraduates: 9,980 (2024)
- Postgraduates: 5,138 (2024)
- Other students: 2,918 – Grade School (2024); 2,118 – Junior High School (2024); 1,924 – Senior High School (2024)
- Location: Loyola Heights, Quezon City, Philippines (main campus); 14°38′20″N 121°4′40″E
- Campus: Urban (main campus), 205 acres (83 ha)
- Language: English
- Newspaper: The Guidon
- Acceptance rate: ~15%
- Colors: Blue and white
- Nickname: Blue Eagles
- Sporting affiliations: UAAP; PVL; PFFWL
- Mascot: Blue Eagle
- Student moniker: Atenean (English), Atenista (Filipino)
- Website: ateneo.edu

A Song for Mary
- Choral version arranged by Mike Luis and Erwin Fajardo, performed by the Ateneo Musicians' Pool: file; help

Ateneo de Manila University (Filipino: Pamantasang Ateneo de Manila; Spanish: Universidad Ateneo de Manila), commonly referred to as the Ateneo de Manila or the Ateneo, is a private Catholic research university in Quezon City, Philippines. Established in 1859 by the Society of Jesus (Jesuits), it is one of the oldest Jesuit-administered institutions of higher education in the Asia-Pacific region.

The university offers primary and secondary education, as well as undergraduate and graduate programs in the humanities, social sciences, natural sciences, engineering, and business. It offers professional degrees through the Graduate School of Business, the School of Government, the School of Medicine and Public Health, and the Ateneo Law School. The university follows the Jesuit tradition of liberal arts education, with an emphasis on the humanities across all levels of education.

== History ==
In 1581, the first Spanish Jesuits arrived in the Philippines. They established Colegio de San José (College of St. Joseph), a seminary, in 1605. In 1768, King Charles III decreed the expulsion of the Jesuit order from Spain and its colonies. Following their banishment, control of the college was transferred to the Dominicans.

The Jesuits returned to the Philippines in the 19th century after their suppression, and were tasked with managing a small public school in Manila called the Escuela Municipal in 1859, renaming it Ateneo Municipal de Manila in 1865 to reflect its elevation to a secondary education institution.

Initially situated in Intramuros, the school, which forcibly became privatized in 1902 at the start of the American colonization, was renamed into Ateneo de Manila to reflect the transition. Ateneo moved to Padre Faura Street, Ermita, Manila, after the original campus was destroyed by fire in 1932. However, the new campus was destroyed during the Battle of Manila by Japanese forces in 1945. After World War II, in 1952, the university relocated to its present campus in Loyola Heights, Quezon City. The law and graduate business schools remained at the Padre Faura campus until 1977, when both moved to Makati City, and the Ermita site was sold (now Robinsons Manila).

Fr. Pacífico Ortíz, SJ became the first Filipino president of the university in 1959 and again for his second term on September 25, 1969. During his tenure, the Graduate School was divided into the Graduate School of Arts and Sciences and what would later become the Graduate School of Business. In July 1964, the Educational TV Center of Ateneo was organized and began operations, becoming one of the first educational television channels in the country. In 1968, the Ateneo co-founded the Asian Institute of Management. Women were first admitted to the college in 1973. By 1976, the Graduate School of Arts and Sciences had moved to Loyola Heights, and the Padre Faura campus was finally closed in 1977.

In the 1970s, Ateneo students became active in protests against the Marcos dictatorship and its imposition of martial law, and many later participated in the 1986 People Power Revolution.

In 1991, the Ateneo Law School became the first in the country to offer the Juris Doctor degree. The School of Government was established in 1996, and a new campus for the Graduate School of Business, Law School, and School of Government opened in Rockwell Center in 1998. Significant developments in the 2000s include the establishment of the Loyola Schools and completion of various educational and recreational facilities.

The university continued to expand and innovate, launching the Pathways to Higher Education initiative in 2002, and consecrating the Church of the Gesù at the Loyola Heights campus in July 2002.

In 2003, the Ateneo formalized its partnership with Gawad Kalinga for university-wide social action. The Manuel V. Pangilinan Center for Student Leadership opened in 2006, and the Ateneo School of Medicine and Public Health began operations in 2007.

In recent years, significant events include a shooting incident in July 2022 that led to the cancellation of the law school's graduation ceremonies, and the consolidation of the university's higher education units in October 2022.

== Campuses ==
The Ateneo de Manila's main campus is located in Loyola Heights, Quezon City, covering 205 acres (83 ha). It houses the university's primary, secondary, and tertiary education units, along with various research centers and institutes.

=== Loyola Heights ===
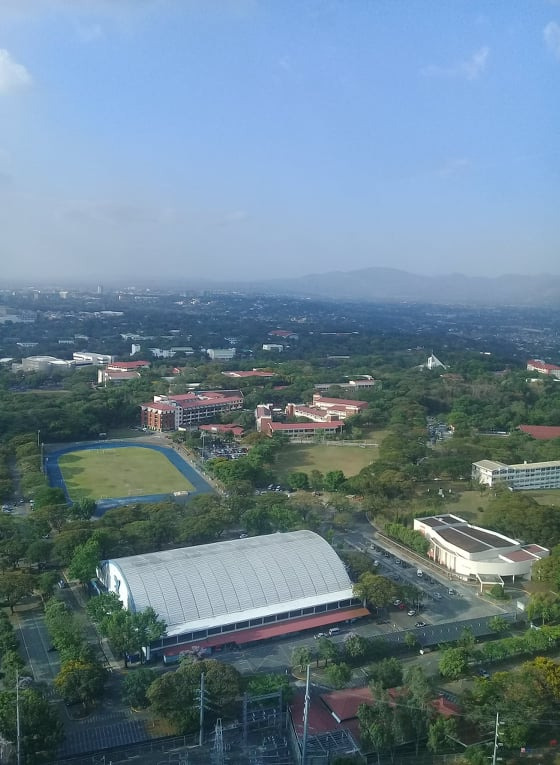
Aerial view of the Loyola Heights campus, looking northeast.

The Loyola Heights campus, adjacent to Miriam College, includes the grade school, high school, and college. It features facilities such as the Henry Lee Irwin Theater, the Science Education Complex, and the John Gokongwei School of Management Complex. In 2018, the university inaugurated the Areté, a creative hub that includes the Ateneo Art Gallery, theaters, and collaborative spaces.

The Rizal Library and several research centers are located here, including the Institute of Philippine Culture and the Manila Observatory. Athletic facilities include the Blue Eagle Gym and the Moro Lorenzo Sports Center.

The campus also hosts the Church of the Gesù and multiple chapels for various departments.

Within the university is home to the largest Jesuit community in the Philippines. It hosts facilities such as the Arrupe International Residence, which houses international Jesuits and guests pursuing studies in the Philippines, San Jose Major Seminary, the Loyola School of Theology, and the Loyola House of Studies.

College Complex

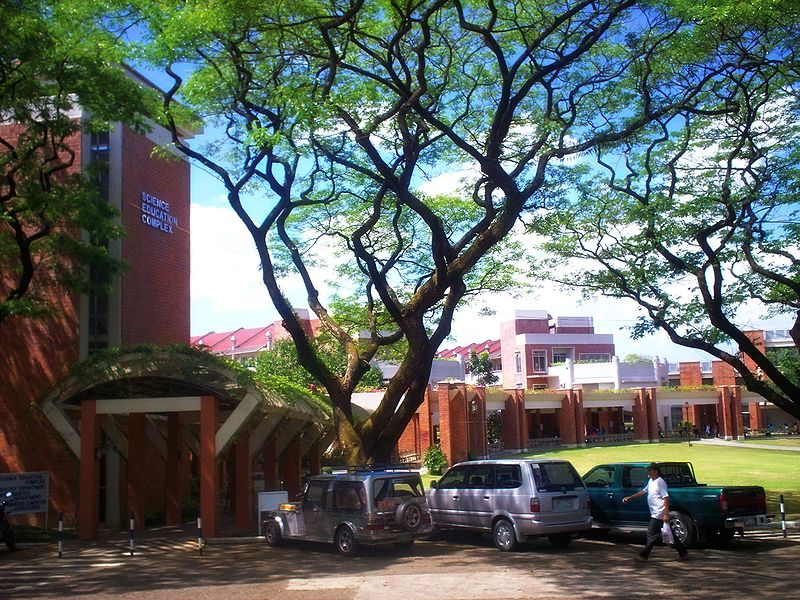
The Science Education Complex

The Horacio dela Costa Hall

The Ricardo & Dr. Rosita Leong Hall

The John Gokongwei School of Management Building

=== Satellite campuses ===
The Rockwell Center in Makati houses the School of Law and the Graduate School of Business, among other Professional School units. The Salcedo Village campus contains various facilities, including the Ateneo Center for Continuing Education. The Ateneo School of Medicine and Public Health is located at the Don Eugenio López Sr. Medical Complex in Ortigas Center, Pasig, alongside its partner hospital, The Medical City.

=== Ateneo Blue Cloud ===
During the COVID-19 pandemic, the Ateneo launched Ateneo Blue Cloud, a virtual campus providing online, blended, and face-to-face learning materials.

== Administration and organization ==
The university is overseen by a board of trustees, chaired by Bernadine T. Siy. The current university president, priest and economist Roberto Yap SJ, leads the central administration. The university's present sectoral structure includes vice-presidents for social development, university and global relations, finance, and administration and human resources.

The Ateneo de Manila has been granted autonomous status by the Philippine Commission on Higher Education (CHED) since 2001, granting it flexibility in introducing new programs. It is one of a select few universities in the country to receive this status.

The university is organized into twelve schools, divided between the higher education and basic education units. Each unit is managed by a vice-president.

=== Higher education ===
The Ateneo's higher education unit comprises nine schools: the School of Humanities, the John Gokongwei School of Management, the School of Science and Engineering, the School of Social Sciences, the Gokongwei Brothers School of Education and Learning Design, the Graduate School of Business, the School of Law, the School of Medicine and Public Health, and the School of Government.

=== Basic education ===
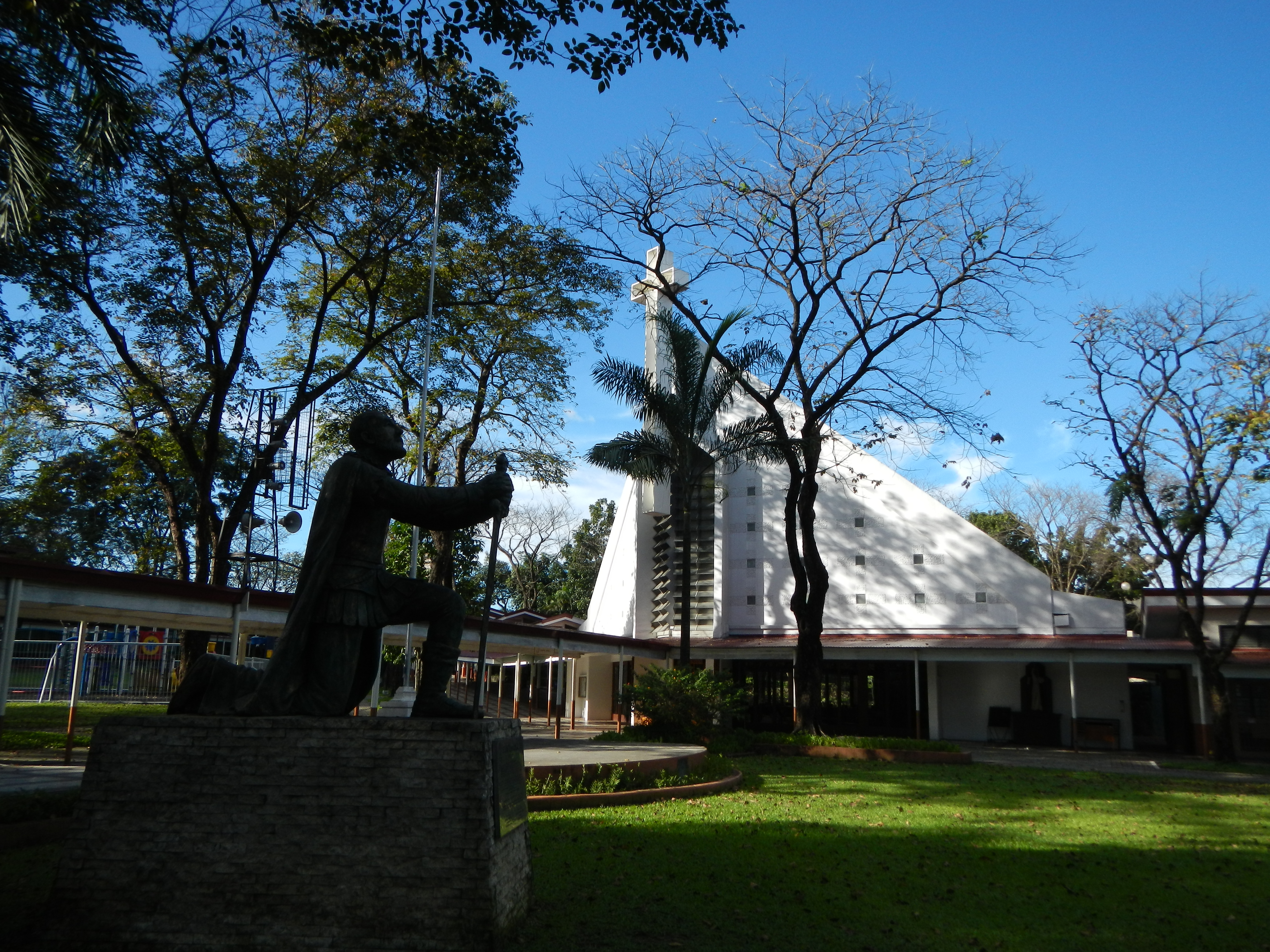
The Chapel of the Holy Guardian Angels and a statue of St. Ignatius of Loyola at the Ateneo de Manila Grade School campus

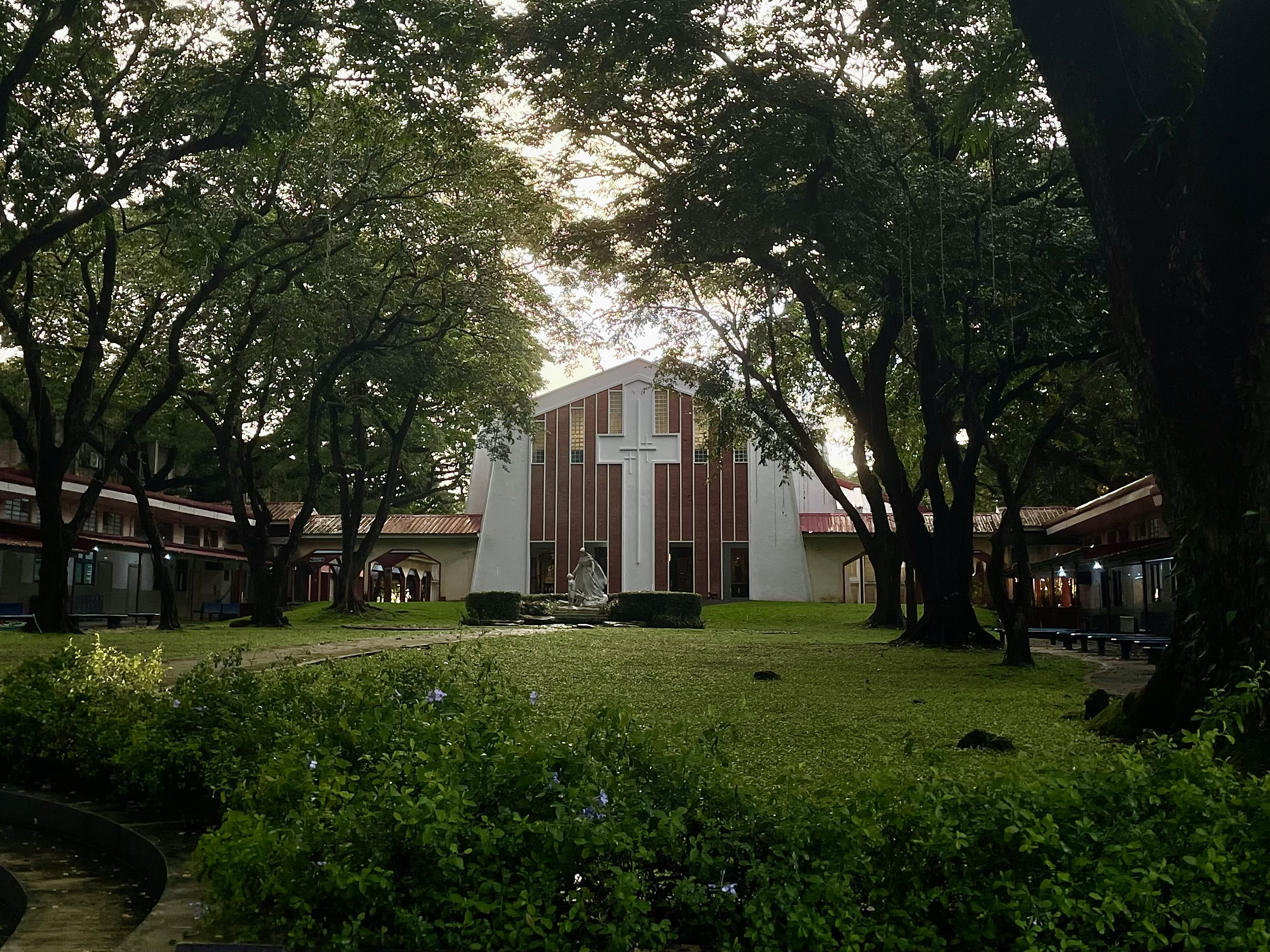
The Chapel of St. Stanislaus Kostka, and classrooms lining the Promenade of Our Lady at the Ateneo de Manila Junior High School campus

The Ateneo de Manila Grade School (AGS) offers elementary education and was the university's first unit. The AGS was one of the first to adopt the Singapore math curriculum in the Philippines.

The Ateneo de Manila Junior High School (AJHS) provides middle school education and was founded in 2013 to comply with the Department of Education K-12 system.

In August 2024, the Ateneo began its transition for the Grade School and the Junior High School to become fully co-educational, and welcomed female students of grade 1 and grade 7 for the school year 2024–2025. It announced that by the school year 2029–2030, basic education from kindergarten to grade 12 will be fully co-educational.

The Ateneo de Manila Senior High School (ASHS) has offered the eleventh and twelfth grades since 2013 and became co-educational in 2016.

=== Loyola School of Theology ===
The Loyola School of Theology, affiliated with the university, offers baccalaureate, licentiate, and doctoral degrees in theology and pastoral ministry.

== Academics ==
=== Colleges and institutes ===
College/Schools
College/school	Founded
School of Law	1936
Graduate School of Business	1948
School of Science and Engineering	1985
School of Government	1996
Dr. Rosita G. Leong School of Social Sciences	2000
School of Humanities	2000
John Gokongwei School of Management	2002
School of Medicine and Public Health	2007
Gokongwei Brothers School of Education and Learning Design	2021

The Ateneo de Manila University provides education at the primary, secondary, undergraduate, and graduate levels. The university offers 48 undergraduate, 93 graduate, and 11 professional degree programs. Dual and joint degrees are also available, including partnerships with international universities.

The primary language of instruction is English, with some classes offered in Filipino.

The Ateneo de Manila University emphasizes a liberal arts undergraduate core curriculum that includes philosophy, literature, theology, history, and the social sciences. This curriculum is designed to foster student-centred learning and community engagement.

=== Admissions, reputation and rankings ===
University rankings

Global – Overall
- QS World: 511 (2026)
- THE World: 1001–1200 (2026)

Regional – Overall
- QS Asia: 141 (2026)
- THE Asia: 501–600 (2026)

National – Overall
- QS National: 2 (2026)
- THE National: 1 (2026)

The Ateneo College Entrance Test (ACET) is required for an admission offer to the Ateneo College (Loyola Schools), considered anecdotally as the most difficult entrance examination in the Philippines aside from the University of the Philippines' College Admissions Test (UPCAT). Furthermore, admission to the university requires strong extracurriculars, recommendations, an essay, and a consistent academic performance from middle school to high school.

Acceptance through the Scholastic Aptitude Test (SAT) is also welcomed with a minimum SAT score of 1200, taken within the last 2 years before the application.

The Ateneo de Manila University is ranked as a top institution in the Philippines by the Times Higher Education World University Rankings and second nationally, and first-ranked private university nationally in the QS World University Rankings. It was first among private universities and second overall in the Philippines in both QS's World and Asia rankings.

As of 2026, the Ateneo is ranked third in the Philippines by the Webometrics Ranking of World Universities and third by EduRank.

The university has 11 Centers of Excellence (CoE) and 6 Centers of Development (CoD) as recognized by CHED.

The Ateneo's academic programs are accredited at Level IV by CHED and the Philippine Accrediting Association of Schools, Colleges and Universities (PAASCU).

Ateneo's John Gokongwei School of Management and the Ateneo Graduate School of Business are both members of the Association to Advance Collegiate Schools of Business, a step towards accreditation. The university is also a frequent publisher in Scopus database, a member of the ASEAN University Network, Association of Christian Universities and Colleges in Asia, International Association of Jesuit Universities, Association of Jesuit Colleges and Universities, Jesuit Basic Education Commission, and a participant of the Erasmus Programme of the European Union.

In addition, the university has linkages in multiple and elite universities in Asia, Europe, Oceania, North and South Americas. Ateneo is anecdotally also a feeder for top Filipino students for Ivy League postgraduate programs, M7 business schools, and other highly ranked foreign universities.

==== Graduate school rankings ====
The Legal Education Board has ranked the Ateneo de Manila School of Law as the top law school in the past decade, producing a 7.18% share or 1,794 out of total new lawyers. The school continues to consistently have the highest passing rate for first-time examinees, topping the 2020/2021 and 2022 Philippine Bar Examinations. Graduates of the Law School have an average grade of 89.2 in the Bar Examinations and the school has produced 23 top notchers in history, the second highest number of bar top notchers.

The Professional Regulation Commission has ranked the School of Medicine and Public Health as the best-performing medical school in the Philippines in 2019, as the school had a 100% passing rate in the Philippine Physician Licensure Examination out of 133 examinees.

The School of Government has been ranked as one of the top public policy schools and is the only Philippine institution listed in the first-ever ranking of public-policy schools in the Asia-Pacific region. The school was ranked 25th by citation impact factor, with a total of 7 citations scoring 1.17 impact factor.

=== Research centers and auxiliary units ===
The Ateneo houses numerous research centers focusing on disaster risk reduction, public education, human migration, and governance, among other fields. These include the Ateneo Center for Economic Research and Development, the Institute of Philippine Culture, and the Manila Observatory.

The Ateneo Business Insights Laboratory for Development (BUILD), in collaboration with Co-Develop, has participated in initiatives promoting the adoption of Digital Public Infrastructure in the Philippines.

- Ateneo Business Insights Laboratory for Development (BUILD)
- Ateneo Center for Asian Studies
- Ateneo Center for Economic Research and Development
- Ateneo Center for Educational Development
- Ateneo Center for English Language Teaching
- Ateneo Center for Organisation Research and Development
- Ateneo Center for Psychological and Educational Assessment
- Ateneo Center for Social Entrepreneurship
- Ateneo Center for Social Policy and Public Affairs
- Ateneo Family Business Development Center
- Ateneo Innovation Center
- Ateneo Institute of Literary Arts and Practices
- Ateneo Java Wireless Competency Center
- Ateneo Language Learning Center
- Ateneo Macroeconomic Research Unit
- Ateneo-PLDT Advanced Network Testbed
- Ateneo Research Network for Development
- Ateneo Teacher Center
- Ateneo de Manila University Press
- Ateneo Wellness Center
- Center for Communication Research and Technology
- Center for Community Services
- Eugenio Lopez Jr. Center for Multimedia Communication
- Gaston Z. Ortigas Peace Institute
- Governor José B. Fernandez Ethics Center for Business and Public Service
- Institute of Philippine Culture
- Institute of Social Order
- Institute for Church and Social Issues
- John Gokongwei School of Management Business Accelerator
- John Gokongwei School of Management Business Resource Center
- Konrad Adenauer Asian Center for Journalism
- Manila Observatory
- National Chemistry Instrumentation Center
- Ninoy and Cory Aquino Center for Leadership
- Pathways to Higher Education-Philippines
- Philippines-Australia Studies Network
- Philippine Institute of Pure and Applied Chemistry
- Ricardo Leong Center for Chinese Studies
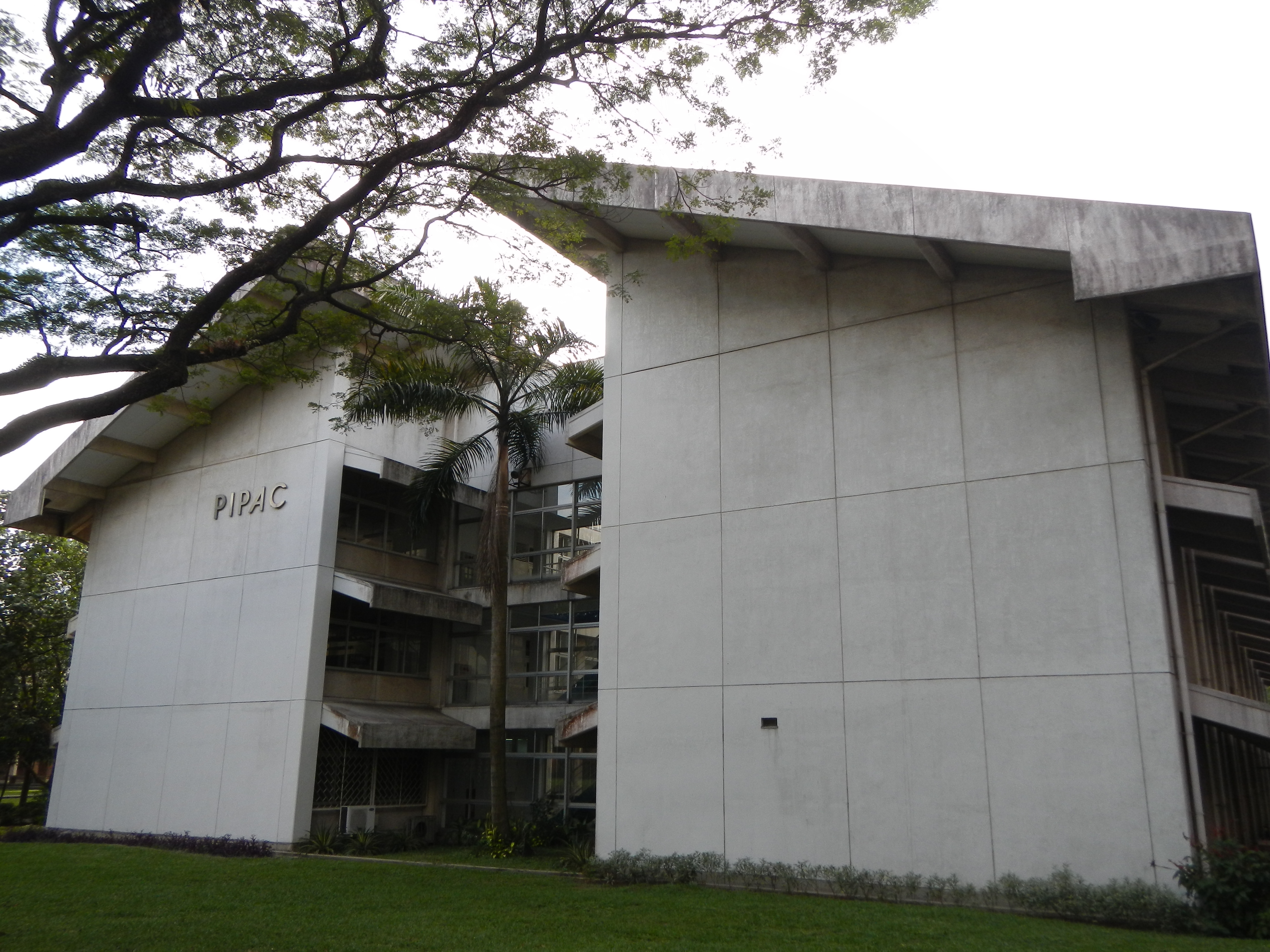
The Philippine Institute of Pure and Applied Chemistry

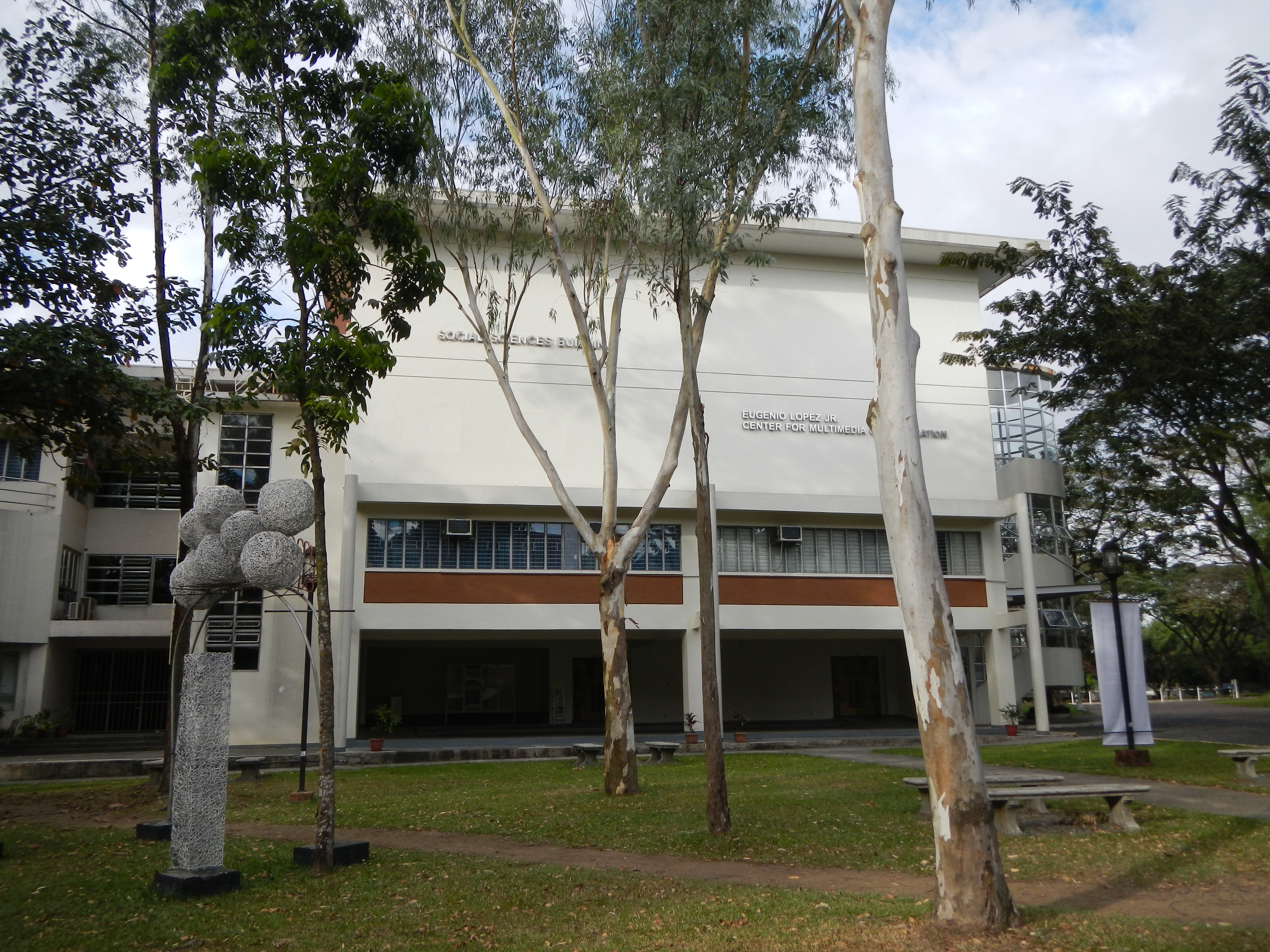
The Eugenio Lopez Jr. Center for Multimedia Communication

== Social initiatives ==
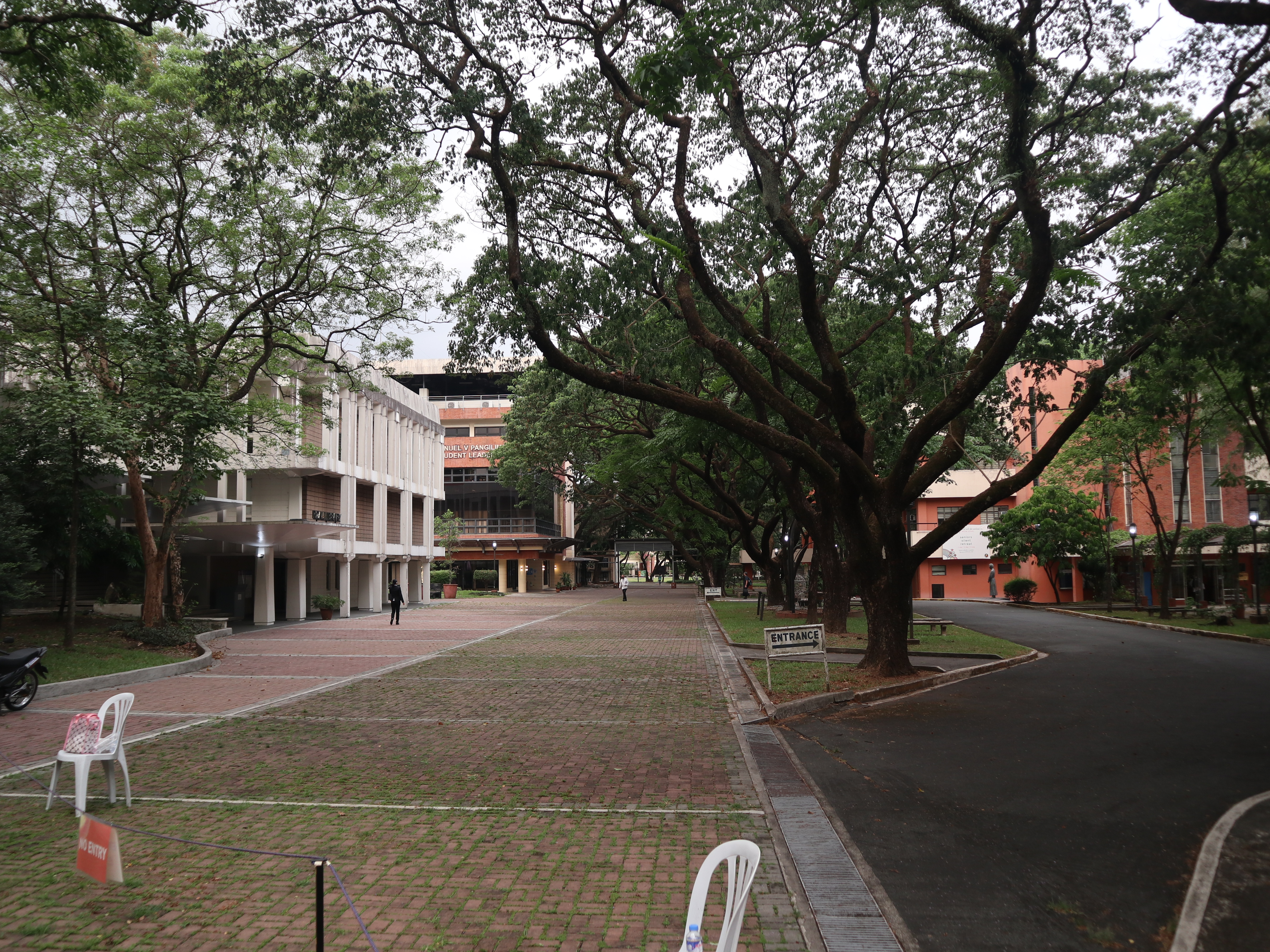
The Ateneo campus in 2022

The Ateneo de Manila University integrates social engagement into its curriculum at all levels. Key initiatives include the Ateneo-Mangyan Project for Understanding and Development, the Bigay Puso program, and housebuilding activities with Gawad Kalinga. These projects aim to promote social responsibility and leadership among students.

The university's main social action program is its partnership with Gawad Kalinga, focusing on community-building and rehabilitation efforts in various regions.

The Ugat Foundation, which supports grassroots families, is also hosted by Ateneo de Manila University.

=== International collaboration ===
The Ateneo de Manila University collaborates with various global institutions, facilitating exchange programs for students and faculty. It partners with Sun Yat-sen University in running the Confucius Institute, which offers Mandarin language courses and a master's program in Teaching Chinese as a Foreign Language.

The Ateneo also has joint masters programs with Queen Mary University of London and partnerships with Le Cordon Bleu, École supérieure des sciences commerciales d'Angers, Kyushu University, Regis University, and the University of Sydney.

The university's Asian Peacebuilders Scholarship, in collaboration with the Nippon Foundation and the University for Peace, trains students in peacebuilding, awarding degrees from both Ateneo and UPEACE.

== Libraries and museum ==
The First Pacific Hall or the New Rizal Library of Ateneo de Manila University, opened in 2009

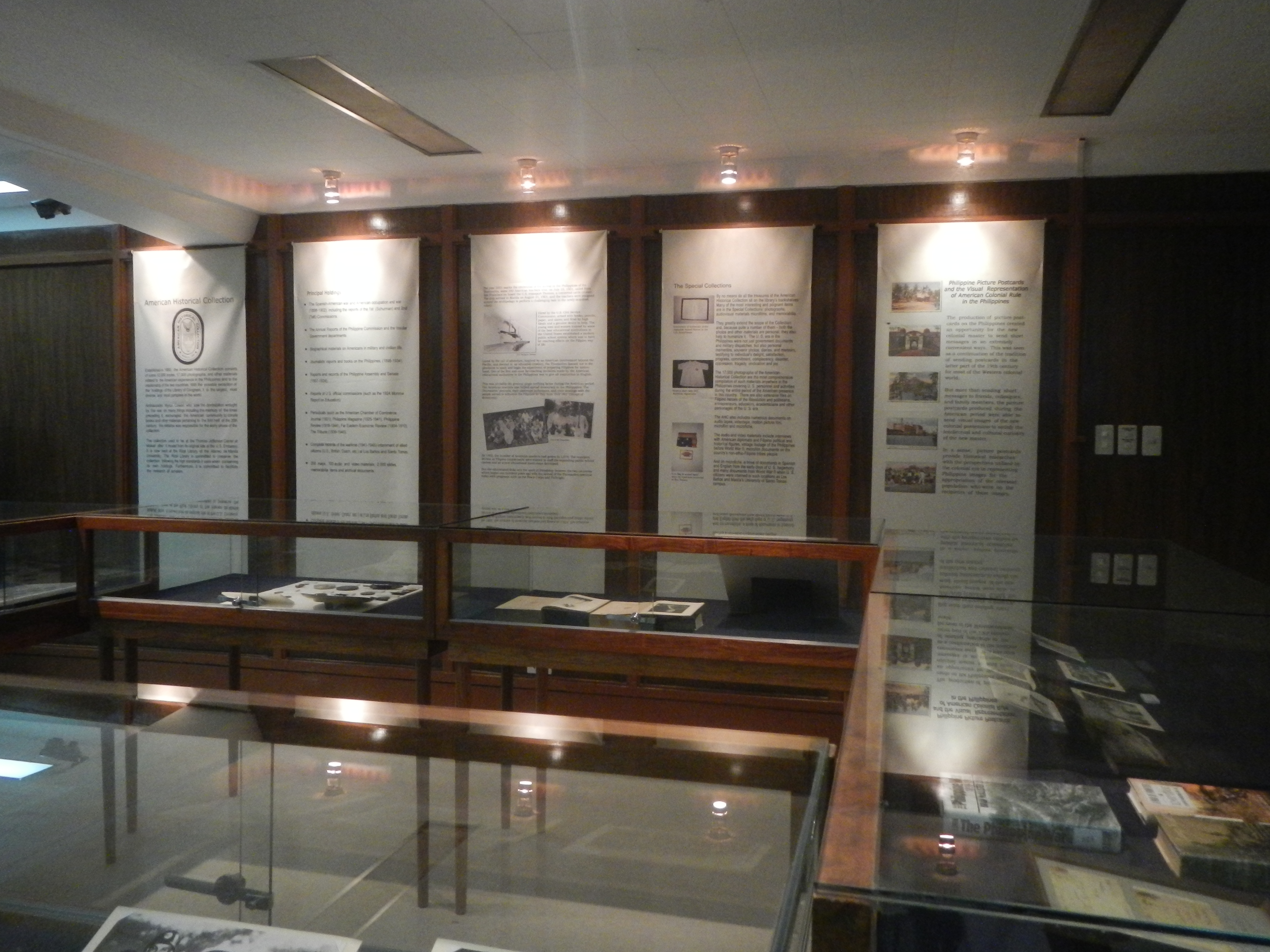
The American Historical Collection at the Special Collections Building or the Old Rizal Library

The Ateneo de Manila University's largest library is the Rizal Library, which is split into the First Pacific Hall and Special Collections Building. The First Pacific Hall or New Rizal Library, inaugurated in November 2009, contains the circulation section, technical services, and modern study areas.

=== Ateneo Art Gallery ===
The Ateneo Art Gallery, established in 1960, is the first museum of modern art in the Philippines. It is housed in the Arts Wing of the Areté and features a collection of modern and contemporary Filipino art.

=== University Archives ===
The University Archives, located in Faber Hall, preserve the historical records and documents of Ateneo de Manila University. They support research on the university's history and administrative functions.

== Student life ==
=== Housing ===
The Ateneo de Manila University offers on-campus housing through several residence halls: Cervini Hall, Eliazo Hall, the University Dormitory–North Tower, the University Dormitory–South Tower, and the International Residence Hall. These facilities provide accommodations for both undergraduate and graduate students.

=== Student organizations ===
The Ateneo Debate Society ranks among the top debate teams in Asia, having secured a top 15 global ranking and winning the 2023 World Universities Debating Championship.

The Ateneo College Glee Club (ACGC) is the oldest university chorale in the Philippines and has achieved international recognition for its performances.

Dulaang Sibol, founded in 1955, is noted as the oldest high school theater group in the Philippines.

Tanghalang Ateneo is the oldest undergraduate student theater group.

== In popular culture ==
The Ateneo de Manila has been associated in Philippine popular culture with perceptions of elitism due to its high tuition costs, historical reputation, and prominent alumni. The university has also been referenced in jokes and internet memes relating to traffic congestion along Katipunan Avenue. Alongside Lasallians, Ateneans are commonly associated with using "conyo", a form of code-switching between English and Filipino linked to upper-class urban youth culture in the Philippines. Despite these perceptions, the university provides academic and financial aid scholarships for students from various socioeconomic backgrounds.

== Notable alumni ==
José Rizal, who is widely regarded as the National Hero of the Philippines, completed his Bachelor of Arts as a sobresaliente (among the top students) in 1877.

The Ateneo de Manila University produced the second-highest number of Philippine presidents, only behind to the University of the Philippines. Presidents Benigno Aquino III—a graduate from A.B. Economics, Ateneo Grade School, and Ateneo High School; Corazon Aquino—L.H.D. honoris causa; Joseph Estrada—grade school and high school; Gloria Macapagal Arroyo—M.A. Economics; and Fidel V. Ramos—MBA, LL.D. honoris causa are among its alumni.

The university has also produced several National Artists of the Philippines, including painter Federico Aguilar Alcuaz—LL.B.; director Lamberto V. Avellana—A.B. magna cum laude; stage designer Salvador Bernal—A.B. Philosophy cum laude; author and former education secretary Alejandro Roces—L.H.D. honoris causa; architect Ildefonso P. Santos Jr.—high school; writer Greg Brillantes—Litt. B.; and playwright and cultural historian/scholar Nicanor Tiongson—A.B. Humanities.

Other alumni include chief justices and associate justices of the Supreme Court of the Philippines, senators, members of the House of Representatives, actors, artists, journalists, scientists, academics, lawyers, physicians, business executives, and local government officials.

== See also ==
- De La Salle University – Ateneo de Manila University's major college rival
  - Ateneo–La Salle rivalry
- Ignatius of Loyola
- List of colleges and universities in Metro Manila
- List of Jesuit educational institutions in the Philippines
- List of Jesuit sites
- Society of Jesus
