= Pansol, Quezon City =

Barangay in Quezon City, Metro Manila, Philippines

Pansol
- Barangay
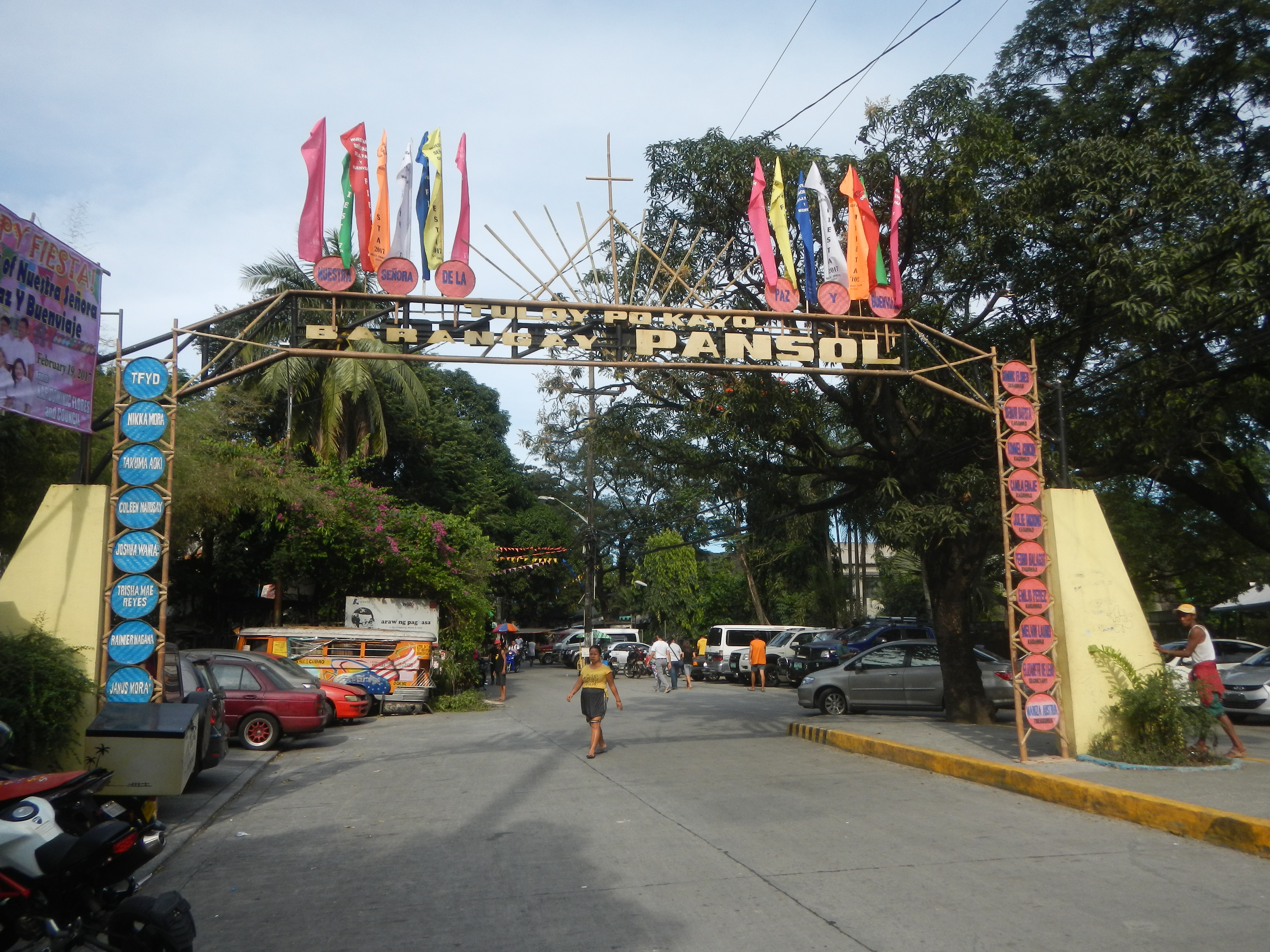
- Welcome arch

- Location within Metro Manila Location within Philippines
- Coordinates: 14°39′05″N 121°04′48″E
- Country: Philippines
- Region: National Capital Region
- City: Quezon City
- District: 3rd District

Government
  - Type: Barangay
  - Barangay Captain: Joseph Mahusay

Area
  - Total: 1.48 km^{2} (0.57 sq mi)

Population (2020)
  - Total: 35,254
  - Density: 23,800/km^{2} (61,700/sq mi)
- Time zone: UTC+8 (PST)

Pansol is a barangay of Quezon City. According to the 2020 Census, it has a population of 35,254 people.

== History ==
Pansol was originally a sitio of Balara, a barrio originally part of Marikina. It was carved out of Marikina in 1939, pursuant to Commonwealth Act No. 502 that created Quezon City.

== Geography ==
Pansol has an area of approximately 1.48 square kilometers (0.57 sq mi).
