= Catalino Arevalo =

Filipino priest (1925–2023)

Catalino Arevalo S.J.
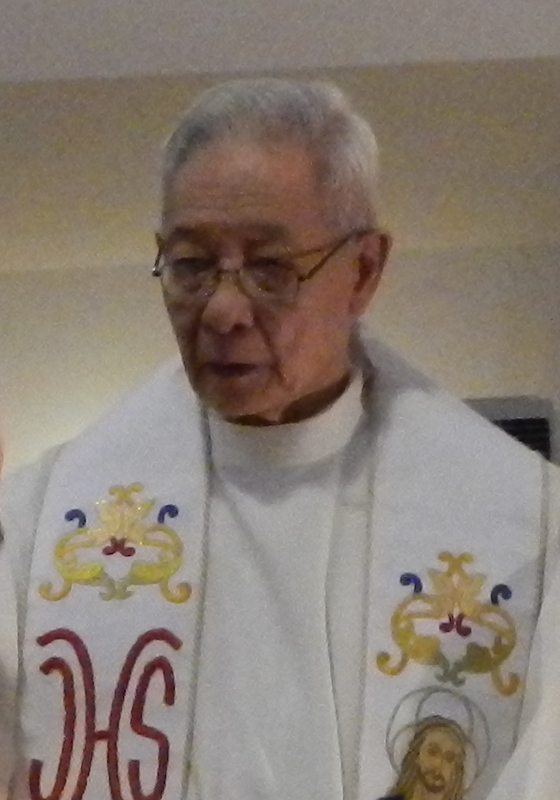
- Arevalo in 2013

Personal life
- Born: April 20, 1925
- Died: January 18, 2023 (aged 97) Quezon City, Philippines
- Notable work: Evangelization in Modern Day Asia (1974)

Religious life
- Religion: Catholic
- Order: Society of Jesus
- Profession: Theologian
- Ordination: June 19, 1954

Senior posting
- Teacher: Francis A. Sullivan
- Post: Chairman, Federation of Asian Bishops' Conferences (1985–1995)
- Students: Luis Antonio Tagle

Catalino G. Arevalo (April 20, 1925 – January 18, 2023) was a Filipino Roman Catholic priest and theologian.

== Early life and education ==
Arevalo was born on April 20, 1925. At 16 years old, he entered the seminary on May 30, 1941, joining the Society of Jesus, or the Jesuits. After his ordination in 1954, he pursued a doctorate degree in dogmatic theology at the Pontifical Gregorian University in Rome under Jesuit ecclesiologist Francis A. Sullivan. He obtained his degree in 1959.

== Career ==
Arevalo was ordained as a priest on June 19, 1954. In 1959, he joined the Jesuit theologate of Woodstock College in Maryland in the United States as its first Filipino teacher. Returning to the Philippines, he taught at the San Jose Seminary until 1965. His pupils included Luis Antonio Tagle who would later become a cardinal.

Arevalo served as dean of the Loyola House of Studies of the Ateneo de Manila University from 1965 to 1966. Arevalo would also serve as the first president of the Jesuit School of Theology (later renamed Loyola School of Theology), also under Ateneo, from 1968 to 1971. He stayed in the school until 2010 teaching various theological courses.

Arevalo would be the first Asian prelate to become a member of the International Theological Commission of the Holy See and the first convener and founding member of the Theological Advisory Commission of the Federation of Asian Bishops' Conferences (FABC). He was chairman of the FABC from 1985 to 1995. He was also a theological peritus with the FABC from 1970 to 1995.

Arevalo would tour Latin America in 1970 and had significant correspondence with fellow prelate Juan Luis Segundo, Lucio Gera, and Gustavo Gutiérrez. The trip would help him come up with ideas on the subject of liberation theology in the Philippines.

Arevalo authored the final document, the Evangelization in Modern Day Asia, for the inaugural FABC Plenary Assembly held in Taipei, Taiwan in 1974 which set the theological orientation of the FABC.

A family friend of the Aquinos, Arevalo also was the spiritual adviser of former President Corazon Aquino from August 21, 1983.

== Death ==
Arevalo died at the Jesuit Health and Wellness Center in Quezon City, on January 18, 2023, at the age of 97.

== Honors and recognition ==
=== Honors ===
- Holy See:
  - Pro Ecclesia et Pontifice (1997)

=== Other ===
- Doctorate Honoris causa in humanities – Ateneo de Manila University (1998)
- Award of Recognition (Father of Asian Theology) – Federation of Asian Bishops' Conferences (2009)
