= American Historical Collection =

Archive of American involvement in the Philippines

- 14.640507077497523°N 121.07785204942697°E
- Location: Philippines

Other information
- Website: rizal.lib.admu.edu.ph/ahc/

The American Historical Collection (AHC), established in 1950, is an archive of American involvement in the Philippines. The AHC is one of the largest, most diverse and most complete collection of materials of this kind in the world and contains 13,518 books, 18,674 photographs, and other various materials.

The AHC is the primary resource in Manila for official documents and reports from 1898 to 1946, such as the Reports of the US-Philippine Commission (1900–1915), Reports of the Governors-General of the Philippine Islands (1916–1935), Reports of the High Commissioner, the Executive Orders and Proclamations (1901–1933), Reports of the War Department and of the Secretary of War (1898–1924), and other insular government reports.

The collection also contains thousands of miscellaneous documents, including pamphlets, reports, articles, and other items that had been collected, as well as the AHC’s files of photographs. These date back to before the US era and include photos of Filipino notables, US officials, and prominent members of the Manila community in the US era.

== History ==
In 1950, US Ambassador Myron Cowen, who saw the devastation wrought by the Second World War on many things, including the memory of the times preceding it, encouraged the American community to donate books and other materials pertaining to the first half of the 20th century. His initiative was responsible for the early phase of the collection.

While it could easily have come under Embassy jurisdiction, Ambassador Cowen wanted the library to have a more permanent and local organization, "as ambassadors come and go".

It was decided that the American Association of the Philippines (AAP) Historical Committee would be responsible for overseeing the new library’s maintenance and finances. The Committee had an equal number of members appointed by the ambassador and by the AAP.

Acquisitions, donations, and funds were administered by the American Historical Committee.

The AHC was first housed at the U.S. Embassy, then above the Thomas Jefferson Cultural Center in Makati. In 1990, a crisis in the life of the collection was overcome with providential help from the U.S. Library of Congress, which, needing space for its own collections, provided financial support for the housing and operation of the library. This assistance continued until 1995, at which time U.S. government support for the AHC was terminated.

With the withdrawal of this support, the American Historical Collection Foundation (AHCF) was created to subsume the American Historical Committee for the purpose of overseeing the collection and raising funds for its continuation. Under a 1995 directive of then U.S. Ambassador John Negroponte, the AHCF inherited the responsibilities of the American Historical Committee.

In 1995, through an agreement by and between the AAP and the Ateneo de Manila University, it was decided that the collection would be permanently held at the Rizal Library of the Ateneo. The Rizal Library is responsible for the conservation of the collection and for facilitating the research of scholars.

== Principal holdings ==
- The Spanish–American War, the American Occupation and Philippine–American War, including the reports of the Schurman Commission and Taft Commission, the First and Second Philippine Commission respectively
- The annual reports of the Philippine Commission and the Insular Government
- Biographical materials on Americans in military and civilian life
- Journalists' reports and books on the Philippines, 1898–1934
- Reports and records of the Philippine Assembly and Philippine Senate, 1907–1934
- Reports of U.S. official commissions, such as the 1924 Monroe Report on Education
- Periodicals, such as the American Chamber of Commerce Journal (1921–1993), Philippine Magazine (1925–1941), Philippine Review (1916–1953), Far Eastern Economic Review (1904–1910).
- Complete records of World War II and the internment of allied citizens (U.S., British, Dutch, etc.) at Los Baños and Santo Tomas.
