= Our Lady of Peace Hospital =

- Foundation of Our Lady of Peace Mission

Geography
- Location: Parañaque, Metro Manila, Philippines
- Coordinates: 14°29′18.0″N 120°59′01.3″E

Organization
- Type: Non-profit
- Religious affiliation: Roman Catholicism

Services
- Beds: 100

History
- Constructed: 2000
- Opened: August 15, 2002

Links
- Lists: Hospitals in the Philippines

The Our Lady of Peace Hospital is a charitable hospital in Parañaque, Metro Manila, Philippines.

== History ==
The Our Lady of Peace Hospital (OLPH) was a project of the Foundation of Our Lady of Peace Mission Inc. (FOLPMI) which was co-founded by Saint Paul of Chartres nun Eva Maamo and Jesuit priest James Reuter in 1984. The FOLPMI conceputalized the hospital project during the administration of President Corazon Aquino.

The FOLPMI garnered support to realize the project via a thirty-minute documentary about the foundation's activities narrated by Reuter. Maamo admitted being able to leverage her receiving the Ramon Magsaysay Award in 1997 for the hospital which she intends to serve the indigent population.

President Fidel V. Ramos facilitated the turnover of government land for the OLPH in 1996. The Public Estates Authority leased the lot to the foundation. The construction of the OLPH was funded by donations from the government and private entities. President Joseph Estrada was present during the groundbreaking ceremony for the OLPH in 2000. A blessing ceremony and soft launch was held on March 26, 2002.

The OLPH was inaugurated on August 15, 2002 as a 100-bed capacity, four-storey hospital. The FOLPMI billed the facility as the "first purely charity hospital built by a non-government organization.

In 2008, the OLPH closed its former main gate facing the Manila–Cavite Expressway to comply with an order by the Public Estates Authority Tollway Corporation.
