= Quezon City's 3rd congressional district =

Legislative district of the Philippines

- Constituency for the House of Representatives of the Philippines
- Interactive map of the district boundaries
- City: Quezon City
- Region: Metro Manila
- Population: 319,371 (2020)
- Electorate: 172,497 (2025)
- Major settlements: 37 barangays: Amihan, Bagumbuhay, Bagumbayan, Bayanihan, Blue Ridge A, Blue Ridge B, Camp Aguinaldo, Claro, Dioquino Zobel, Duyan-Duyan, E. Rodriguez, East Kamias, Escopa I, Escopa II, Escopa III, Escopa IV, Libis, Loyola Heights, Mangga, Marilag, Masagana, Matandang Balara, Milagrosa, Pansol, Quirino 2-A, Quirino 2-B, Quirino 2-C, Quirino 3-A, Saint Ignatius, San Roque, Silangan, Socorro, Tagumpay, Ugong Norte, Villa Maria Clara, West Kamias, White Plains
- Area: 46.27 km^{2} (17.86 sq mi)

Current constituency
- Created: 1987
- Representative: Franz S. Pumaren
- Political party: NUP; SBP
- Congressional bloc: Majority

Quezon City's 3rd congressional district is one of the six congressional districts of the Philippines in Quezon City. It has been represented in the House of Representatives of the Philippines since 1987. The district consists of the southeastern barangays bordering Marikina and Pasig to the southeast, Kamias Road and the second district to the north, the fourth district to the west and San Juan to the southwest via EDSA. It contains the commercial areas of Cubao, Libis, Bagumbayan, Ugong Norte and the residential areas of Loyola Heights, Quirino, Old Balara and Blue Ridge. It is currently represented in the 19th Congress by Franz Pumaren of the National Unity Party (NUP) and Serbisyo sa Bayan Party (SBP).

The 3rd Legislative District of Quezon City includes the Araneta City and the Eastwood City located in Cubao and Bagumbayan, respectively.

== Representation history ==
#	Image	Member	Term of office		Congress	Party	Electoral history	Constituent LGUs
#	Image	Member	Start	End	Congress	Party	Electoral history	Constituent LGUs
=== Quezon City's 3rd district for the House of Representatives of the Philippines ===
District created February 2, 1987.
1		Nikki Coseteng	June 30, 1987	June 30, 1992	8th	KAIBA	Elected in 1987.	1987–1988; Amihan, Bagumbuhay, Bagumbayan, Bayanihan, Blue Ridge A, Blue Ridge B, Camp Aguinaldo, Dioquino Zobel, Duyan-Duyan, E. Rodriguez, East Kamias, Escopa I, Escopa II, Escopa III, Escopa IV, Libis, Loyola Heights, Mangga, Marilag, Masagana, Matandang Balara, Milagrosa, Pansol, Quirino 2-A, Quirino 2-B, Quirino 2-C, Quirino 3-A, Quirino 3-B, San Roque, Silangan, Socorro, Tagumpay, Ugong Norte, Villa Maria Clara, West Kamias, White Plains
1		Nikki Coseteng	June 30, 1987	June 30, 1992	8th	NPC	Elected in 1987.	1988–present Amihan, Bagumbuhay, Bagumbayan, Bayanihan, Blue Ridge A, Blue Ridge B, Camp Aguinaldo, Claro, Dioquino Zobel, Duyan-Duyan, E. Rodriguez, East Kamias, Escopa I, Escopa II, Escopa III, Escopa IV, Libis, Loyola Heights, Mangga, Marilag, Masagana, Matandang Balara, Milagrosa, Pansol, Quirino 2-A, Quirino 2-B, Quirino 2-C, Quirino 3-A, Saint Ignatius, San Roque, Silangan, Socorro, Tagumpay, Ugong Norte, Villa Maria Clara, West Kamias, White Plains
2		Dennis Roldan	June 30, 1992	June 30, 1995	9th	LDP	Elected in 1992	1988–present Amihan, Bagumbuhay, Bagumbayan, Bayanihan, Blue Ridge A, Blue Ridge B, Camp Aguinaldo, Claro, Dioquino Zobel, Duyan-Duyan, E. Rodriguez, East Kamias, Escopa I, Escopa II, Escopa III, Escopa IV, Libis, Loyola Heights, Mangga, Marilag, Masagana, Matandang Balara, Milagrosa, Pansol, Quirino 2-A, Quirino 2-B, Quirino 2-C, Quirino 3-A, Saint Ignatius, San Roque, Silangan, Socorro, Tagumpay, Ugong Norte, Villa Maria Clara, West Kamias, White Plains
3		Mike Defensor	June 30, 1995	January 20, 2001	10th	Liberal	Elected in 1995.	1988–present Amihan, Bagumbuhay, Bagumbayan, Bayanihan, Blue Ridge A, Blue Ridge B, Camp Aguinaldo, Claro, Dioquino Zobel, Duyan-Duyan, E. Rodriguez, East Kamias, Escopa I, Escopa II, Escopa III, Escopa IV, Libis, Loyola Heights, Mangga, Marilag, Masagana, Matandang Balara, Milagrosa, Pansol, Quirino 2-A, Quirino 2-B, Quirino 2-C, Quirino 3-A, Saint Ignatius, San Roque, Silangan, Socorro, Tagumpay, Ugong Norte, Villa Maria Clara, West Kamias, White Plains
3		Mike Defensor	June 30, 1995	January 20, 2001	11th	Liberal	Re-elected in 1998. Resigned on appointment as Housing and Urban Development Coordinating Council chairperson	1988–present Amihan, Bagumbuhay, Bagumbayan, Bayanihan, Blue Ridge A, Blue Ridge B, Camp Aguinaldo, Claro, Dioquino Zobel, Duyan-Duyan, E. Rodriguez, East Kamias, Escopa I, Escopa II, Escopa III, Escopa IV, Libis, Loyola Heights, Mangga, Marilag, Masagana, Matandang Balara, Milagrosa, Pansol, Quirino 2-A, Quirino 2-B, Quirino 2-C, Quirino 3-A, Saint Ignatius, San Roque, Silangan, Socorro, Tagumpay, Ugong Norte, Villa Maria Clara, West Kamias, White Plains
4		Ma. Theresa Defensor	June 30, 2001	June 30, 2004	12th	Liberal	Elected in 2001.	1988–present Amihan, Bagumbuhay, Bagumbayan, Bayanihan, Blue Ridge A, Blue Ridge B, Camp Aguinaldo, Claro, Dioquino Zobel, Duyan-Duyan, E. Rodriguez, East Kamias, Escopa I, Escopa II, Escopa III, Escopa IV, Libis, Loyola Heights, Mangga, Marilag, Masagana, Matandang Balara, Milagrosa, Pansol, Quirino 2-A, Quirino 2-B, Quirino 2-C, Quirino 3-A, Saint Ignatius, San Roque, Silangan, Socorro, Tagumpay, Ugong Norte, Villa Maria Clara, West Kamias, White Plains
5		Matias Defensor Jr.	June 30, 2004	June 30, 2010	13th	Liberal	Elected in 2004.	1988–present Amihan, Bagumbuhay, Bagumbayan, Bayanihan, Blue Ridge A, Blue Ridge B, Camp Aguinaldo, Claro, Dioquino Zobel, Duyan-Duyan, E. Rodriguez, East Kamias, Escopa I, Escopa II, Escopa III, Escopa IV, Libis, Loyola Heights, Mangga, Marilag, Masagana, Matandang Balara, Milagrosa, Pansol, Quirino 2-A, Quirino 2-B, Quirino 2-C, Quirino 3-A, Saint Ignatius, San Roque, Silangan, Socorro, Tagumpay, Ugong Norte, Villa Maria Clara, West Kamias, White Plains
5		Matias Defensor Jr.	June 30, 2004	June 30, 2010	14th	Lakas	Re-elected in 2007.	1988–present Amihan, Bagumbuhay, Bagumbayan, Bayanihan, Blue Ridge A, Blue Ridge B, Camp Aguinaldo, Claro, Dioquino Zobel, Duyan-Duyan, E. Rodriguez, East Kamias, Escopa I, Escopa II, Escopa III, Escopa IV, Libis, Loyola Heights, Mangga, Marilag, Masagana, Matandang Balara, Milagrosa, Pansol, Quirino 2-A, Quirino 2-B, Quirino 2-C, Quirino 3-A, Saint Ignatius, San Roque, Silangan, Socorro, Tagumpay, Ugong Norte, Villa Maria Clara, West Kamias, White Plains
6		Jorge Banal Jr.	June 30, 2010	June 30, 2019	15th	Liberal	Elected in 2010.	1988–present Amihan, Bagumbuhay, Bagumbayan, Bayanihan, Blue Ridge A, Blue Ridge B, Camp Aguinaldo, Claro, Dioquino Zobel, Duyan-Duyan, E. Rodriguez, East Kamias, Escopa I, Escopa II, Escopa III, Escopa IV, Libis, Loyola Heights, Mangga, Marilag, Masagana, Matandang Balara, Milagrosa, Pansol, Quirino 2-A, Quirino 2-B, Quirino 2-C, Quirino 3-A, Saint Ignatius, San Roque, Silangan, Socorro, Tagumpay, Ugong Norte, Villa Maria Clara, West Kamias, White Plains
6		Jorge Banal Jr.	June 30, 2010	June 30, 2019	16th	Liberal	Re-elected in 2013.	1988–present Amihan, Bagumbuhay, Bagumbayan, Bayanihan, Blue Ridge A, Blue Ridge B, Camp Aguinaldo, Claro, Dioquino Zobel, Duyan-Duyan, E. Rodriguez, East Kamias, Escopa I, Escopa II, Escopa III, Escopa IV, Libis, Loyola Heights, Mangga, Marilag, Masagana, Matandang Balara, Milagrosa, Pansol, Quirino 2-A, Quirino 2-B, Quirino 2-C, Quirino 3-A, Saint Ignatius, San Roque, Silangan, Socorro, Tagumpay, Ugong Norte, Villa Maria Clara, West Kamias, White Plains
6		Jorge Banal Jr.	June 30, 2010	June 30, 2019	17th	Liberal	Re-elected in 2016.	1988–present Amihan, Bagumbuhay, Bagumbayan, Bayanihan, Blue Ridge A, Blue Ridge B, Camp Aguinaldo, Claro, Dioquino Zobel, Duyan-Duyan, E. Rodriguez, East Kamias, Escopa I, Escopa II, Escopa III, Escopa IV, Libis, Loyola Heights, Mangga, Marilag, Masagana, Matandang Balara, Milagrosa, Pansol, Quirino 2-A, Quirino 2-B, Quirino 2-C, Quirino 3-A, Saint Ignatius, San Roque, Silangan, Socorro, Tagumpay, Ugong Norte, Villa Maria Clara, West Kamias, White Plains
7		Allan Benedict Reyes	June 30, 2019	June 30, 2022	18th	PFP	Elected in 2019.	1988–present Amihan, Bagumbuhay, Bagumbayan, Bayanihan, Blue Ridge A, Blue Ridge B, Camp Aguinaldo, Claro, Dioquino Zobel, Duyan-Duyan, E. Rodriguez, East Kamias, Escopa I, Escopa II, Escopa III, Escopa IV, Libis, Loyola Heights, Mangga, Marilag, Masagana, Matandang Balara, Milagrosa, Pansol, Quirino 2-A, Quirino 2-B, Quirino 2-C, Quirino 3-A, Saint Ignatius, San Roque, Silangan, Socorro, Tagumpay, Ugong Norte, Villa Maria Clara, West Kamias, White Plains
7		Allan Benedict Reyes	June 30, 2019	June 30, 2022	18th	NPC	Elected in 2019.	1988–present Amihan, Bagumbuhay, Bagumbayan, Bayanihan, Blue Ridge A, Blue Ridge B, Camp Aguinaldo, Claro, Dioquino Zobel, Duyan-Duyan, E. Rodriguez, East Kamias, Escopa I, Escopa II, Escopa III, Escopa IV, Libis, Loyola Heights, Mangga, Marilag, Masagana, Matandang Balara, Milagrosa, Pansol, Quirino 2-A, Quirino 2-B, Quirino 2-C, Quirino 3-A, Saint Ignatius, San Roque, Silangan, Socorro, Tagumpay, Ugong Norte, Villa Maria Clara, West Kamias, White Plains
8		Franz Pumaren	June 30, 2022	Incumbent	19th	NUP (SBP)	Elected in 2022.	1988–present Amihan, Bagumbuhay, Bagumbayan, Bayanihan, Blue Ridge A, Blue Ridge B, Camp Aguinaldo, Claro, Dioquino Zobel, Duyan-Duyan, E. Rodriguez, East Kamias, Escopa I, Escopa II, Escopa III, Escopa IV, Libis, Loyola Heights, Mangga, Marilag, Masagana, Matandang Balara, Milagrosa, Pansol, Quirino 2-A, Quirino 2-B, Quirino 2-C, Quirino 3-A, Saint Ignatius, San Roque, Silangan, Socorro, Tagumpay, Ugong Norte, Villa Maria Clara, West Kamias, White Plains
8		Franz Pumaren	June 30, 2022	Incumbent	20th	NUP (SBP)	Re-elected in 2025.	1988–present Amihan, Bagumbuhay, Bagumbayan, Bayanihan, Blue Ridge A, Blue Ridge B, Camp Aguinaldo, Claro, Dioquino Zobel, Duyan-Duyan, E. Rodriguez, East Kamias, Escopa I, Escopa II, Escopa III, Escopa IV, Libis, Loyola Heights, Mangga, Marilag, Masagana, Matandang Balara, Milagrosa, Pansol, Quirino 2-A, Quirino 2-B, Quirino 2-C, Quirino 3-A, Saint Ignatius, San Roque, Silangan, Socorro, Tagumpay, Ugong Norte, Villa Maria Clara, West Kamias, White Plains

== Election results ==
=== 2010 ===
Philippine House of Representatives election at Quezon City's 3rd district
Party	Candidate	Votes	%
Liberal	Jorge Banal, Jr.	37,408	38.02
Lakas–Kampi	Matias Defensor, Jr.	30,887	31.39
NPC	Franz Pumaren	27,611	28.06
Bagumbayan	Catherine Violago	2,254	2.29
Independent	Pedrito Espin	231	0.23
Valid ballots		98,391	95.06
Invalid or blank votes		5,116	4.94
Total votes		103,507	100.00
Liberal gain from Lakas–Kampi			

=== 2013 ===
2013 Philippine House of Representatives election at Quezon City's 3rd district
Party	Candidate	Votes	%
Liberal	Jorge Banal, Jr.	48,822	52.05
UNA	Matias Defensor, Jr.	38,909	41.48
Margin of victory		9,913	10.57%
Valid ballots		87,731	93.54
Invalid or blank votes		6,062	6.46
Total votes		93,793	
Liberal hold			

=== 2016 ===
2016 Philippine House of Representatives election at Quezon City's 3rd district
Party	Candidate	Votes	%
Liberal	Jorge "Bolet" Banal	79,579	
Invalid or blank votes		26,458	
Total votes		106,037	
Liberal hold			

=== 2019 ===
2019 Philippine House of Representatives election in Quezon City's 3rd district
Party	Candidate	Votes	%
PFP	Allan Benedict Reyes	70,184	74.5
PDP–Laban	Dante de Guzman	22,204	23.6
PDDS	Jessie Dignadice	1,826	1.9
Valid ballots		94,214	88.3
Invalid or blank votes		12,459	11.7
Total votes		106,673	100.0
PFP gain from Liberal			

=== 2022 ===
2022 Philippine House of Representatives election in Quezon City's 3rd district
Party	Candidate	Votes	%
NUP	Franz Pumaren	59,782	50.7
NPC	Allan Benedict Reyes (incumbent)	55,966	47.4
Independent	Jessie Dignadice	2,254	1.9
Total votes		126,634	100.00
NUP gain from NPC			

=== 2025 ===
Candidate	Party	Votes	%
Franz Pumaren (incumbent)	National Unity Party	73,946	56.10
Allan Benedict Reyes	Partido Federal ng Pilipinas	57,874	43.90
Total		131,820	100.00
Registered voters/turnout		172,497	–
National Unity Party hold			
Source: Commission on Elections

== See also ==
- Legislative districts of Quezon City
