= Church of the Gesù, Quezon City =

Roman Catholic church in Quezon City, Philippines

Church of the Gesù
- Church facade in 2015
- Church of the Gesù
- 14°38′24″N 121°04′48″E
- Location: Ateneo de Manila University; Loyola Heights, Quezon City
- Country: Philippines
- Denomination: Roman Catholic
- Religious order: Society of Jesus
- Website: www.ateneo.edu

Architecture
- Architect(s): Jose Pedro Recio and Carmelo Casas
- Architectural type: Church building
- Groundbreaking: 2001
- Completed: July 2003

Specifications
- Capacity: 1,000

Administration
- Diocese: Cubao

The Church of the Gesù is the Roman Catholic church of the Ateneo de Manila University campus in Quezon City in the Philippines. It is under the jurisdiction of the Diocese of Cubao.

The church was designed by Jose Pedro Recio and Carmelo Casas. The edifice's massive triangular structure symbolizes the Holy Trinity, as well as the three-fold mission and vision of the school. Its shape and design are also meant to suggest the outstretched arms of the Sacred Heart, and the traditional Filipino bahay kubo (nipa hut). The site has a total area of 10,200 square metres (110,000 sq ft) and seating capacity for 1,000 persons. The church is situated on Sacred Heart Hill, a small hill overlooking Bellarmine Field, believed to be the highest point in barangay Loyola Heights. In its immediate vicinity are the dormitories (Cervini and Eliazo Halls) and the John Pollock Renewal Center. The peak cross and carillon of the church can be seen from Katipunan Avenue, which borders the campus to the west.

One side of the church houses a chapel dedicated to the Virgin Mary as the Immaculate Conception, patroness of Ateneo de Manila and of the Philippines, while another side chapel is dedicated to the Sacred Heart of Jesus, a devotion committed to the Jesuits by Jesus's appearances to Saint Margaret Mary Alacoque at a convent in Paray-le-Monial in 1671.

In front of the church is a Sacred Heart statue depicting Jesus with welcoming, outstretched arms. At the base of the statue is an inscription from Matthew 11:28: "Come to me all of you who are burdened, and I will refresh you. Take my yoke upon you and learn from me, for I am meek and gentle of heart, thus you will find refreshment for your souls. My yoke is sweet and my burden light." The small field to the north of the church has a statue depicting the Agony in the Garden.

== History ==
Ateneo de Manila acquired a campus in what would become Loyola Heights, Quezon City in the late 1940s. In 1952, when Ateneo transferred to Loyola Heights from Padre Faura Street in Manila, Fr. William Masterson, S.J. envisioned the construction of a church on the campus. However, only the Blue Eagle Gym (located near the Grade School) stood, having been the first structure built in what would eventually be Loyola Heights.

It was not until around 50 years later that construction of the church began. On September 30, 2001, the cornerstone of the church was blessed and laid. The church dedication liturgy for the church was celebrated by Cardinal Jaime Sin on July 31, 2002, and attended by several distinguished guests, including former Philippine President Corazon Aquino.

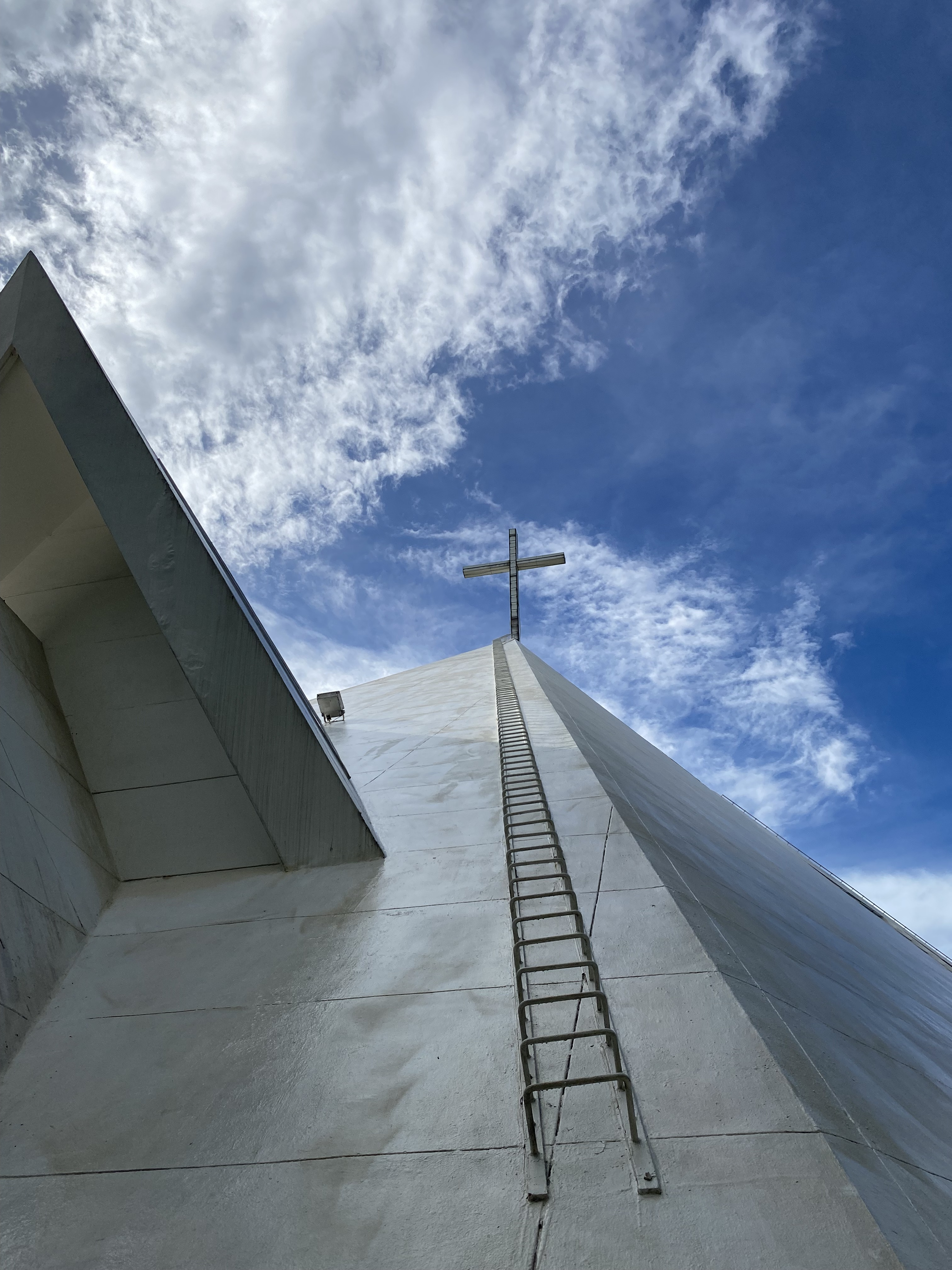
View of the back of the church with rooftop cross, 2024

In 2005, an 18-bell chime and an Angelus bell were added to the church, a donation from the High School class of 1960 and the College class of 1964. The group also donated an additional five bells in 2010, converting the chime into a 23-bell carillon. The bells chime at 6:00 am and 12:00 pm.

== Distinctive features ==
Church interior in 2021 during the wake of former president and Ateneo alumnus Benigno Aquino III

Inside the Church's western entrance is a semicircle of stained glass depicting the Stations of the Cross. At the center of the semicircle is the church's holy water font. It is placed on a hole on the floor with a rim surrounded by the rays of the Jesuits' seal. The stoup itself is an upright brownstone, with a depression on top acting as the basin and the outlet for the water covered with a clay plate with the Jesuit seal. The water circulates over the sides of the basin, therefore the water is not stagnant and does not contain any debris.

The altar is supported by a slab of adobe rock, believed to be in abundant supply underneath the Loyola Heights campus. The huge crucifix above the main altar is unusual, depicting Jesus still alive, looking up, contrary to many crucifixes that depict Jesus already dead, his head bowed down.

== See also ==
- List of Jesuit sites
