= List of M7 business schools =

List of prestigious business schools

The M7 business schools is a group of business schools recognized as having strong MBA programs, that are often highly-ranked in US MBA rankings. The name comes from the informal network that the deans of the aforementioned M7 schools created to share information with each other and discuss best practices with each other twice a year. Through the years, the group has been limited by the self-anointed seven institutions.

== M7 business schools ==
| School name | Host institution | Location | Acceptance rate | Image | Degree programs offered | Year founded |
|---|---|---|---|---|---|---|
| Chicago Booth School of Business | University of Chicago | Chicago, Illinois | 21% | | MBA, EMBA, PhD | 1898 |
| Columbia Business School | Columbia University | New York City, New York | 22.4% | | MPhil, MS, MBA, EMBA, PhD | 1916 |
| Harvard Business School | Harvard University | Boston, Massachusetts | 13.2% | | MBA, PhD, DBA | 1908 |
| Kellogg School of Management | Northwestern University | Evanston, Illinois | 32.3% | | MBA, EMBA, MMM, JD-MBA, PhD | 1908 |
| MIT Sloan School of Management | Massachusetts Institute of Technology | Cambridge, Massachusetts | 17.8% | | MBA, EMBA, LGO, PhD | 1914 |
| Stanford Graduate School of Business | Stanford University | Stanford, California | 8.4% | | MBA, MSx, PhD | 1925 |
| Wharton School | University of Pennsylvania | Philadelphia, Pennsylvania | 24.8% | | BS Econ, MBA, EMBA, PhD | 1881 |

== Related programs at M7 Schools ==
- Stanford offers a joint MBA and MS in Computer Science program, MBA and MS in Electrical Engineering, E-IPER/MBA, JD/MBA, and MPP/MBA
- Harvard offers joint degree programs with Harvard Kennedy School, Harvard Law School, and Harvard Medical School.
- MIT offers a Leaders for Global Operations (LGO) program, a dual degree MBA and SM in engineering.
- Wharton has joint degree programs with Johns Hopkins School of Advanced International Studies and the University of Pennsylvania Law School.
- Columbia offers several dual degree programs, including MBA/MPH, MBA/MS, and MBA/JD.
- Chicago Booth offers a joint MBA/MA in International Relations and other interdisciplinary degrees.
- Kellogg offers unique dual degree programs such as the MMM (MBA + MSDI) with the Northwestern McCormick School of Engineering and JD-MBA with Northwestern Pritzker School of Law.

== See also ==
- List of United States graduate business school rankings
- List of Ivy League business schools
