= Loyola Heights =

Barangay in Quezon City, Metro Manila, Philippines

- Barangay
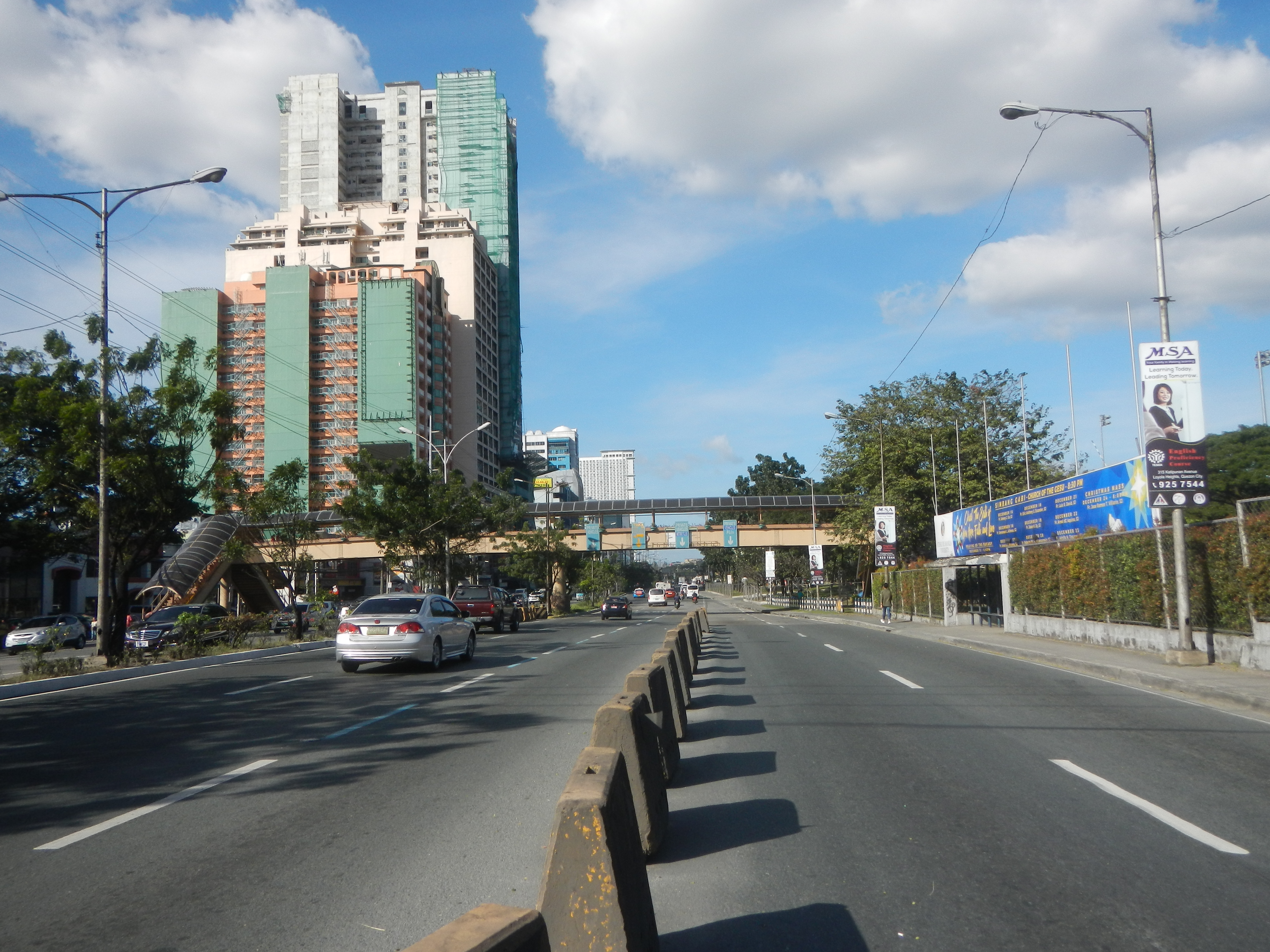
- Katipunan Avenue
- Interactive map of Loyola Heights
- Location within Metro Manila Location within Philippines
- Coordinates: 14°38′25″N 121°04′28″E
- Country: Philippines
- Region: National Capital Region
- City: Quezon City
- District: 3rd District
- Established: September 26, 1960
- Named for: St. Ignatius of Loyola

Government
  - Type: Barangay
  - Barangay Captain: Darwin Hayes

Population (2020)
  - Total: 21,140
- Time zone: UTC+8 (PST)
- Postal Code: 1108

Loyola Heights is a barangay of Quezon City. According to the 2021 Census, it has a population of 21,140 people. It is an affluent district, containing high-end gated communities such as the Loyola Grand Villas, Xavierville, and Alta Vista Subdivision. It is the home to prestigious universities such as Ateneo de Manila University and Miriam College. It was established on September 26, 1960, through City Ordinance No. 60-4512, which created the Barrio of Loyola Heights. It was named after Ignatius of Loyola, the founder of the Society of Jesus or Jesuits that also runs the Ateneo de Manila University.

== Geography ==
A segment of the West Valley Fault traverses Loyola Heights.
