= International Association of Jesuit Universities =

- Abbreviation: IAJU
- Formation: 11 July 2018; 8 years ago
- Founder: Society of Jesus
- Purpose: Organization of Jesuit higher education institutions
- Headquarters: General Curia of the Society of Jesus; Borgo S. Spirito 4, C.P. 6139, 00195 Roma-Prati, Italy
- Coordinates: 41°54′4.9″N 12°27′38.2″E
- Chairman: Michael Garanzini, SJ
- Parent organization: Society of Jesus
- Website: iaju.org

The International Association of Jesuit Universities (IAJU) is an association of higher education institutions run by the Society of Jesus. It was founded in 2018, upon the approval of Rev. Fr. Arturo Sosa SJ, Father General of the society. The current chair of the IAJU board is Fr. Michael Garanzini, SJ.

The IAJU is "the international advisory and coordinating body to the Secretariat of Jesuit Higher Education and, through him, to Father General and his Assistants in matters related to higher education and the intellectual apostolate," according to its charter. It was established during an international assembly of Jesuit higher educational institutions at the University of Deusto in Bilbao, Spain.

The IAJU is part of the Jesuits' higher education apostolate, and its main mission is to "contribute to the progress" of the said apostolate to "promote the development of a more just and humane world for the greater honor and glory of God."

== Membership ==
Members of the IAJU come from the six educational associations representing geographical areas where the Society of Jesus operates. These include more than 200 Jesuit-run higher education institutions in more than 50 countries.

- Association of Jesuit Colleges and Universities in Africa and Madagascar
- KIRCHER Network - network of Jesuit Higher Education Institutions in Europe and the Near East
- Jesuit Higher Educational Association South Asia
- Association of Universities Entrusted to the Society of Jesus in Latin America
- Association of Jesuit Colleges and Universities in Asia Pacific
- Association of Jesuit Colleges and Universities (North America)
