= Our Lady of Guidance =

Sworn Patroness of Manila

Our Lady of Guidance Nuestra Señora de Guía
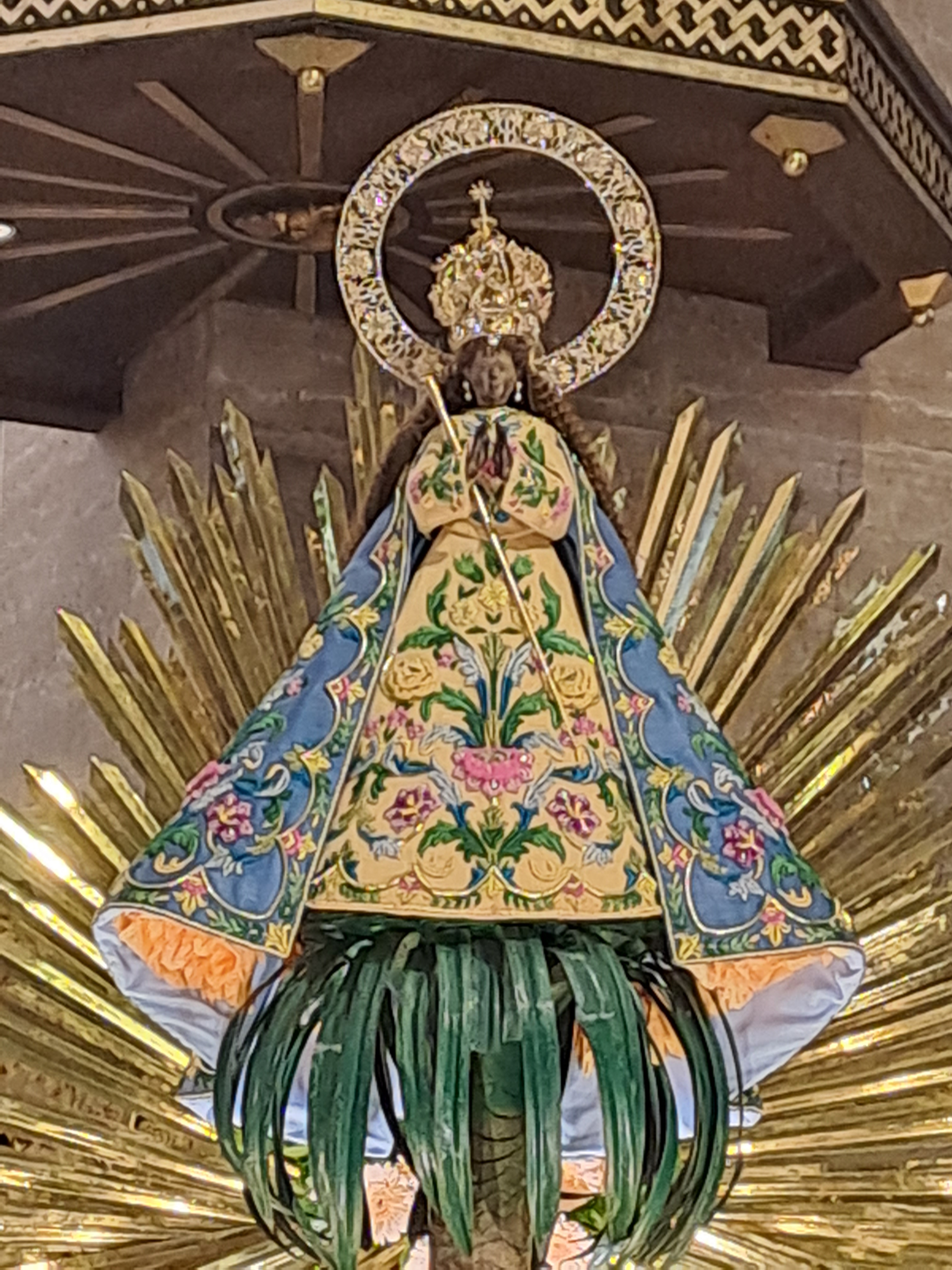
- The original icon at the Manila Cathedral
- Location: Ermita, Manila, Philippines
- Date: 19 May 1571
- Witness: Natives of Laguio (now Ermitaños), Governor-General Miguel López de Legazpi and his soldiers
- Type: Molave wood
- Venerated in: Roman Catholic Church
- Shrine: Archdiocesan Shrine of Our Lady of Guidance, Ermita, Manila
- Patronage: Navigators, travellers, seafarers, Overseas Filipino Workers
- Attributes: Pandan leaves, open hands, marshal's baton, dark skin, Chinese features
- Feast day: December 18; May 19 (discovery of the image)

Our Lady of Guidance (Latin: Nostra Domina de Via) is a Roman Catholic title of the Blessed Virgin Mary associated with a sixteenth-century image of the Immaculate Conception widely venerated by Filipinos. The wooden Black Madonna is considered the oldest extant Marian statue in the Philippines. Locally venerated as patroness of sea navigators and migrant travelers, the image is enshrined in the Ermita Church in Manila, Philippines.

The venerated image is often associated with the cult of Marian devotion amongst Overseas Filipino Workers. Due to its age and fragility, the original Marian image does not leave the premises of its shrine except when a reigning Pope visits the country.

== Description ==
Made of indigenous molave (Vitex cofassus) wood, the statue stands about 50 centimetres (20 in) and is characterized by dark skin, Asiatic features, and long brunette hair. It is often dressed in both a manto and a stylized tapis, the indigenous wraparound skirt of Filipino women.

Among her imperial regalia are a sceptre, a parure of jewels offered by the former Archbishop of Manila, Cardinal Rufino Jiao Santos in 1960, and a golden crown bestowed by Pope Paul VI during his visit to Manila Cathedral on 16 May 1971 on the occasion of her fourth centennial anniversary (1571).

== History ==
According to the Anales de la Catedral de Manila (English: The Annals of the Cathedral of Manila), the crew of Miguel López de Legazpi discovered a group of natives in what is now Ermita along the eastern shores of Manila Bay worshiping a statue of a female figure. There are several theories of its origin, as an Animist-Hindu Diwata, an East Asian statue due to her Chinese features, a Marian icon imported from nearby Portuguese Macau, or, due to its striking resemblance to the Santo Niño de Cebu, a relic of the Magellan Expedition (1521).

While its original purpose is debated, the image was later identified by missionaries as the Virgin Mary. Local folklore recounts the Spaniards witnessing natives venerating the statue in a "pagan manner", by placing it on a trunk surrounded by pandan plants. The pandan is a common food ingredient in the Indianised cultures of South and Southeast Asia to which it is cultivated, albeit the species itself originated in the Maluku Islands where the people are ethnolinguistically Papuans and are culturally Oceanian. The manner of worship of this Catholic icon is remembered in the placement of pandan leaves, real or imitation, around the image’s base as one of its attributes.

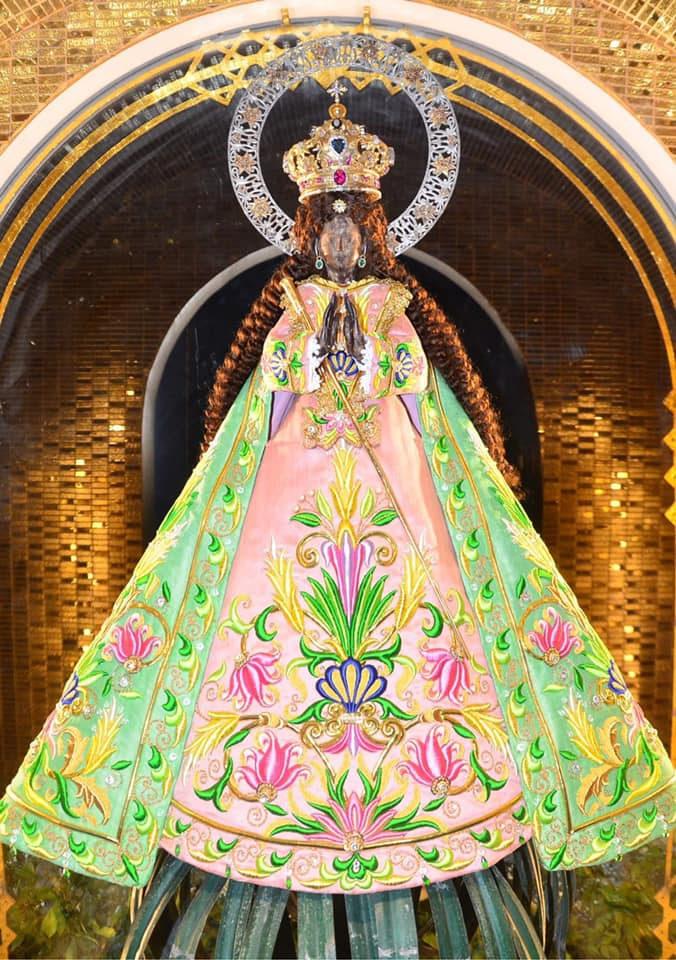
Closer view of the image

On 19 May 1571, the local sovereigns Raja Sulayman III and Raja Matanda, tributaries of the Ming dynasty and blood cousins to the Sultans of Brunei, ceded the fortified city-state of Maynila as well as Tondo to the Spanish Empire, with Miguel López de Legazpi, who had arrived from Mexico, consecrating the city to both Saint Pudentiana and Our Lady of Guidance. In 1578, Philip II of Spain issued a royal decree invoking Our Lady of Guidance to be "sworn patroness" of Manila. The statue was first enshrined in Manila Cathedral inside the citadel of Intramuros until 1606, when the first shrine compound was built on the current site. Called La Hermita ("the Hermitage") because of a Mexican hermit who lived in the area, the shrine was originally made of bamboo, nipa, and molave wood. It was later rebuilt in stone but suffered damaged in an earthquake in 1810. The icon was first revered under the title of the Immaculate Conception, however, the Spanish explorers who first discovered her, together with the native Filipinos who witnessed their wishes and supplications granted before the icon, considered her q common guide. When the image was later moved to La Hermita from Intramuros, the tower of the shrine emitted light at night or during storms. This light guided traveling ships and sailors in the darkness, and people named the icon "Our Lady of Guidance".

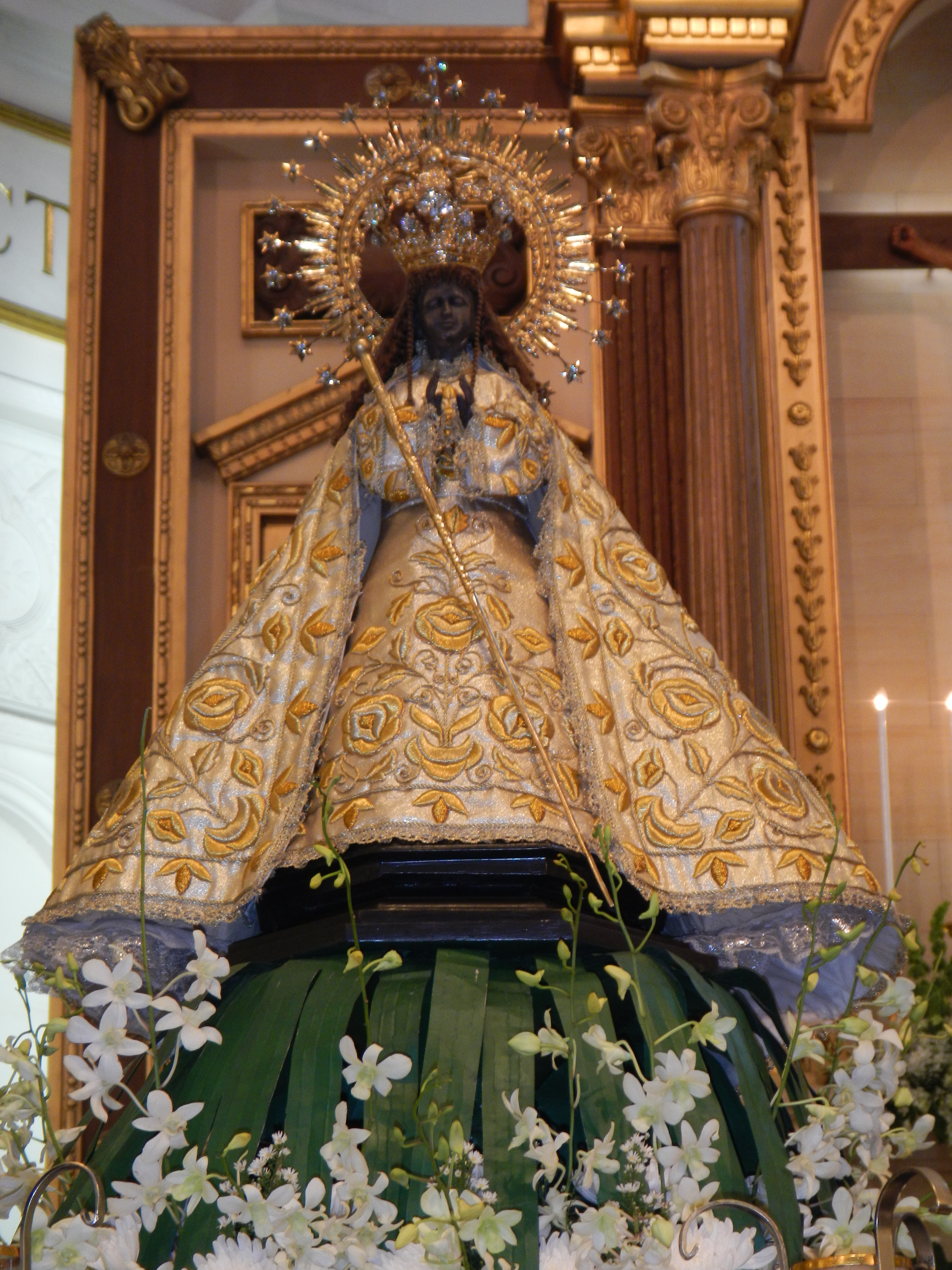
An official proxy replica of the image called La Vicaria, intentionally made for the purpose of public devotion and the preservation of the original image

The Spanish employed a strategic syncretism of the pre-Islamic, Indianised Tagalog religion with the incipient Hispano-Mesoamerican Catholicism introduced by them. They did this via elevating Manila's pre-Islamic cultural layer, in which, Our Lady of Guidance was a part of, as a concerted effort to discredit the recent Islamisation of Manila to whom, their progressing Syncretistic Hispanization, was a reaction. The Spanish had motives to make Our Lady of Guidance as a local Philippine palladium as a reaction to Islam, as they also fought against Islam in Spain during the Reconquista and of which, they consider the Spanish expansion from Iberia, to Latin America, to the Philippines a continuation of their war against Islam in Europe to Islam in Asia.

In 1897, a booklet titled Novena o Pagsisiam sa Nuestra Señora de Guía ("Novena to Our Lady of Guidance") was published by the Pontifical and Royal University of Santo Tomas in Manila. The text recounts the image's origin story, where natives found it sitting on a trunk, and built a roof above it, and the surrounding pandan plants. The text goes on to condemn them for their polytheism, and mentions murder. The image initially had a feast day on 18 December (coinciding with the Feast of the Expectation of the Blessed Virgin Mary), but the date was transferred to 19 May when a rainstorm struck Manila Cathedral in February 1771. The original feast day was restored in 2023.

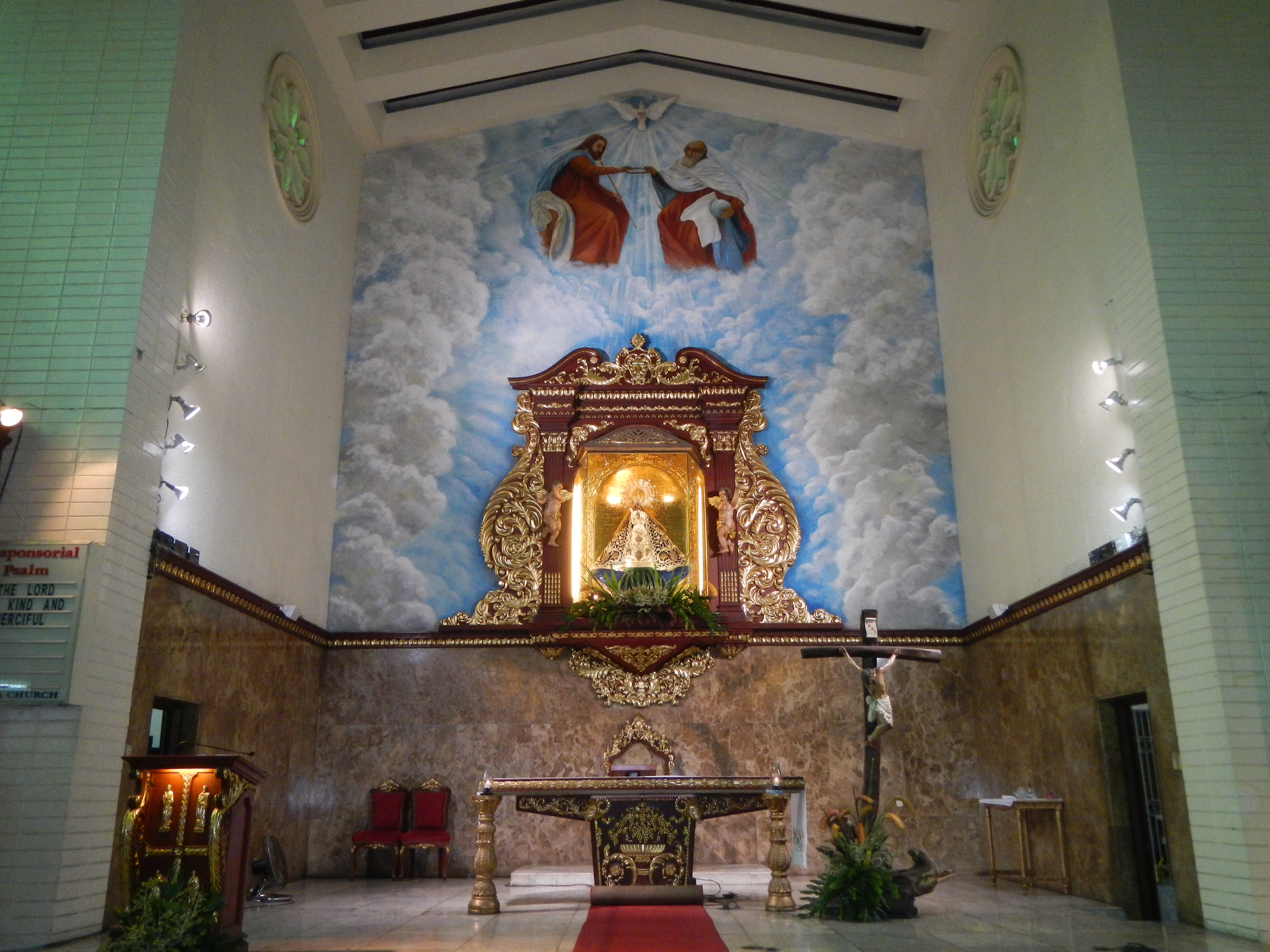
The image enshrined above the high altar of Ermita Church

The image remained enshrined at the Manila Cathedral until its transfer to the current Ermita shrine in 1918. During the Second World War, the statue was saved by the parish priest of Ermita Church, Father Blas de Guernica, and local engineer Justo Navarro López. They hid the statue in a niche of the church crypt a few weeks before the Allies liberated Manila in February 1945. After the battle, Fr. Rogelio Bedonia, along with a chaplain and four soldiers of the United States Army, went to the obliterated shrine, retrieved the icon, and brought it to a safer place. Until the construction of a temporary chapel, the icon stayed in a private house on Taft Avenue, in San Miguel de Mayumo, and finally in Quiapo. The current shrine was completed in 1947.

A replica of the image was made to commemorate the quadricentennial of the icon's finding. From May 1970 to 1971, the replica visited almost all parishes, chapels, hospitals, schools, and other institutions in the Archdiocese of Manila. It is this replica which is used for processions and public veneration on its feast day, with the original remaining ensconced in its glass alcove above the main altar.

In December 2011, EWTN featured the statue as the "oldest Marian Icon in the Philippines" in the program, "Mary: Mother of the Philippines". Father Patrick Peyton also once preached a sermon on the Family Rosary Crusade in the presence of the image.

== Coronation ==
During the Marian year of 1954, a petition was sent to the Vatican to crown the image. The Marian image was ceremoniously crowned on 30 December 1955 by the former Apostolic Nuncio to the Philippines, Archbishop Egidio Vagnozzi.

The former Archbishop of Manila, Cardinal Rufino Jiao Santos crowned the image once again with a separate golden crown gifted by Pope Paul VI on 16 May 1971. To date however, the image has not yet merited any existing decree of Pontifical coronation in Rome.

== Transfer during Papal visits ==
Pope Paul VI venerated the image at the Manila Cathedral during his Apostolic visit on 27 November 1970.

In January 1995, the statue was removed from the shrine and placed in the room of Pope John Paul II for the duration of his visit for World Youth Day 1995.

On 14 January 2015, the image was transferred to the Apostolic Nunciature along Taft Avenue, where Pope Francis stayed during his Apostolic visit. The icon was later brought Quirino Grandstand for the Pontifical Mass he celebrated on 18 January.

== Archdiocesan shrine ==
The church was granted archdiocesan shrine status in 2005 under former Archbishop of Manila, Cardinal Gaudencio Rosales. The current parish priest and rector is the Reverend Monsignor Mario David Enríquez, who was installed on 16 July 2015.

== Patronage ==
Due to the church's proximity to the United States Embassy, the statue is often visited by locals who petition the Virgin for safety in overseas travel. Devotees claim that when invoked under this title, the Virgin's intercession is speedy and miraculous, particularly in securing approval of requests for United States visas. Our Lady of Guidance is also considered the patroness of all Overseas Filipino Workers.

== See also ==
- Catholic Church in the Philippines
