= Attymass =

Attymass Áth Tí an Mheasaigh
- Village
- Ballymore Lough lies immediately north of Attymass

- Location in Ireland
- Coordinates: 54°03′N 9°05′W
- Country: Ireland
- Province: Connacht
- County: County Mayo
- Time zone: UTC+0 (WET)
  - Summer (DST): UTC-1 (IST (WEST))

Attymass (Irish: Áth Tí an Mheasaigh) is a village and civil parish in County Mayo, Ireland.

== History ==
Evidence of ancient settlement in the area includes a number of ringforts (in the townlands of Carrick and Kilgellia) and several crannóg sites at nearby Ballymore Lough.

The Roman Catholic church in the village was built in 1958 on the site of an earlier 19th-century chapel.

The Fr Patrick Peyton Memorial Centre, which was officially opened in 1998, commemorates the village's association with Fr Patrick Peyton. Peyton, also known as the "Rosary Priest", was the founder of the Family Rosary Crusade and was born in the area in 1909.

The Irish Hunger Memorial in New York City features a stone cottage that originally belonged to the Slack family of Carradoogan in Attymas, before eventually being deserted in the 1960s.

== Sport ==
Moy Villa Football Club, established in 1992, is based in Kilgellia, Attymass and plays in the Mayo League. In September 2012, Moy Villa achieved promotion to Premier A of the Mayo League. In late 2013, Moy Villa reached the Elvery's Sports Super League for the first time in the club's history. In 2006, the club built an Astro turf facility with floodlights, with funding being sourced locally and via the Sports Capital Development Fund.

== See also ==
- Ballycong
- List of towns and villages in Ireland
