= Family Theater (Mutual Broadcasting System) =

American radio and television show

- Genre: Anthology
- Country of origin: United States
- Language: English
- Syndicates: Mutual Broadcasting System
- Produced by: Family Theater Productions
- Original release: February 13, 1947 – September 11, 1957
- No. of episodes: 540
- Website: www.familytheater.org/classicradio

Family Theater is a weekly half-hour dramatic anthology radio program which aired on the Mutual Broadcasting System in the United States from February 13, 1947, to September 11, 1957.

== Production history ==
Family Theater developed from a Rosary prayer program on a local radio station in Albany, New York, started in 1943 by Holy Cross priest Patrick Peyton. On Mother's Day 1945, he produced a similar national radio program on the Mutual Broadcasting System.

In 1947, Peyton formed Family Theater Productions, a film and radio studio extension of the Family Rosary Crusade founded by Peyton to promote family prayer. The program had no commercial sponsor. By agreement with the Mutual network, the radio dramas were nonsectarian but focused on moral problems. Mutual provided the airtime, while Peyton covered production costs through donations.

A total of 482 original episodes were produced. The program featured not only religious stories, but also half-hour adaptations of literary works such as A Tale of Two Cities, Moby-Dick, and Don Quixote.

Peyton and Family Theater Productions continued in radio and expanded into films and television. Peyton arranged for many of Hollywood's stars in film and radio at the time to appear on Family Theater. Throughout its ten-year run, well-known actors and actresses, including James Stewart, Gregory Peck, Dennis Morgan, Dorothy Warenskjold, Irene Dunne, Robert Mitchum, Henry Fonda, Bob Hope, Lucille Ball, Shirley Temple, Natalie Wood, Barbara Whiting, Raymond Burr, Jane Wyatt, Charlton Heston, Lizabeth Scott, Bing Crosby, Jack Benny, Gene Kelly, Kate Smith, William Shatner, and Chuck Connors, appeared as announcers, narrators, or stars. Many donated their services.

Family Theater was broadcast in the United States, Canada, Latin American, Australia, Mozambique, and the Philippines and won a number of industry awards. The motto of Family Theater Productions is "The family that prays together stays together."

== Television ==
In 1951, while the radio version was still on the air, Family Theater moved to television, where it aired in syndication. The spelling of the title was altered to Family Theatre and the series was extended to one hour. Father Peyton also hosted the TV version, which ran for seven years.

One of the TV episodes was "Hill Number One", famous for featuring an early appearance by James Dean as John the Apostle (not John the Baptist, as erroneously noted on DVD releases of the episode). It combined a Korean War story with the story of the Crucifixion of Christ.

== Present day ==
After Peyton's death in 1992, Family Theater Productions became part of Holy Cross Family Ministries, sponsored by the Congregation of Holy Cross.

Family Theater, now digitally remastered, continues to air in reruns in the United States and many other parts of the world. EWTN, for instance, airs the program on Sunday nights under the name "Family Theater Classic Radio". In addition, the program is available to download or stream on internet services such as the Internet Archive.
