= Ballycong =

Townland in County Mayo, Ireland

Coordinates: 54°03′11″N 9°06′53″W

Ballycong (Irish: Béal Átha Conga) is a small townland southeast of Ballina, located between the River Moy and the Ox Mountains. Ballycong townland has an area of about 580 acres (0.91 mi^{2}), and had a population of 28 people as of the 2011 census.

Ballycong Lough lies to the west of the townland, and the village of Attymass to the east. There are several peat bogs in the area.
