= Ermita Church =

Roman Catholic church in Manila, Philippines

- Archdiocesan Shrine of Nuestra Señora de Guia
- Archdiocesan Shrine of Our Lady of Guidance
- La Ermita de Nuestra Señora de Guía (Spanish)
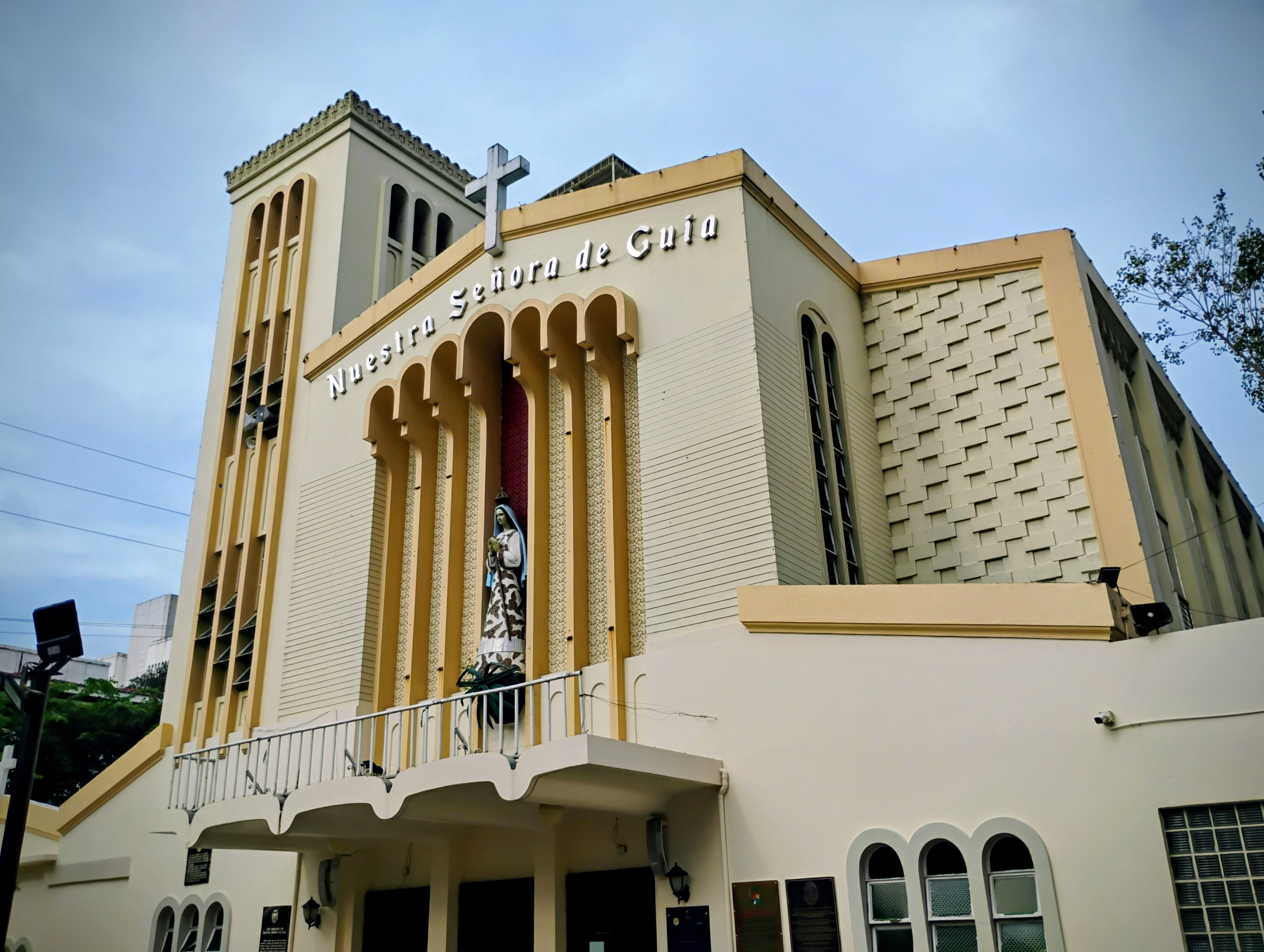
- Church façade in September 2025
- Ermita Church
- 14°34′43″N 120°58′47″E
- Location: Ermita, Manila
- Country: Philippines
- Denomination: Roman Catholic

History
- Former name: Hermitage of Our Lady of Guide
- Status: Shrine
- Founded: 1606; 420 years ago
- Dedication: Nuestra Señora de Guía

Architecture
- Functional status: Active
- Architect: Carlos A. Santos-Viola
- Architectural type: Chapel
- Style: Modern
- Groundbreaking: 1947; 79 years ago
- Completed: 1953; 73 years ago

Administration
- Archdiocese: Manila
- Deanery: Nuestra Señora de Guia
- Parish: Nuestra Señora de Guia

Clergy
- Rector: Estelito Villegas
- Vicar: Eduardo Miguel Ramirez
- Dean: Joel de Leon Rescober

The Archdiocesan Shrine of Nuestra Señora de Guia, commonly known as Ermita Church, is a Roman Catholic church and shrine located in Ermita within the city of Manila, Philippines.

The shrine is dedicated to the Blessed Virgin Mary under the title of Our Lady of Guidance, which is considered to be oldest Marian image in the country.

== History ==
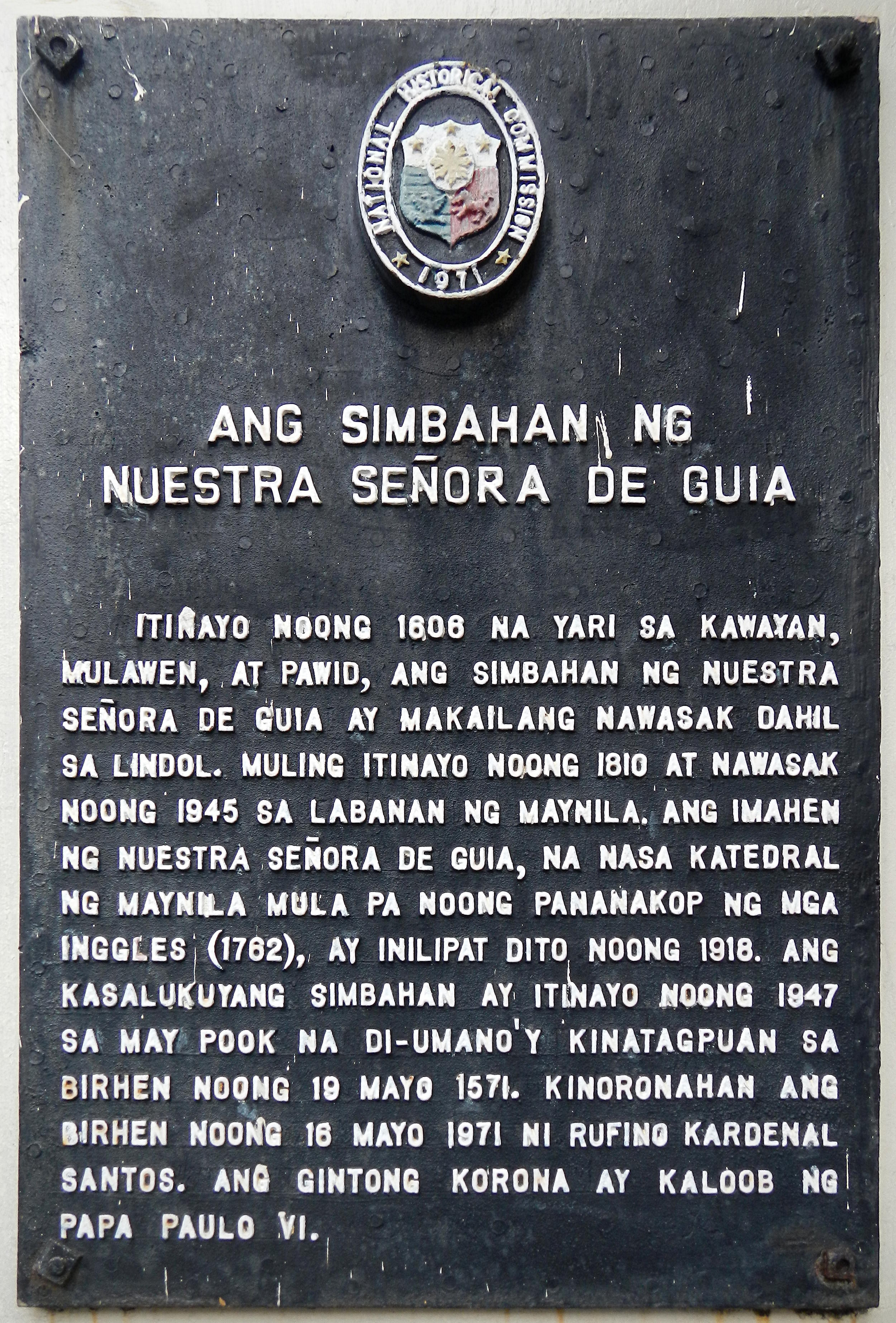
Church NHC historical marker installed in 1971

The church began as a rustic shrine made of bamboo, nipa, and molave wood that was built to house the image of Our Lady of Guidance in the area where it was found in 1571 by Spanish soldiers under Miguel López de Legazpi. The shrine eventually became a chapel built in 1606 as house for the image and was called La Hermita ("The Chapel" or "Hermitage" in English). The word also gave the name to the present district in Manila where the chapel is located. A Mexican hermit-priest came to the area and built a hermitage there, thus, transforming its name to Ermita. Juan Fernández de León who was a hermit from Mexico before relocating to Manila, was responsible for build up La Hermita.

The church was damaged many times due to earthquakes. In addition, the image had to be transferred to the Manila Cathedral for safekeeping during the British occupation of Manila in 1762–1764. A more permanent stone church was built in 1810; the image was returned to the church in 1918.

In 1945 near the end of World War II, the church was reduced to rubble during the Battle of Manila, resulting in the loss of all of its records. However, the image was saved from destruction and was temporarily kept in a private residence. Work began for the reconstruction of the church in 1947 with a new design by architect Carlos A. Santos-Viola. On March 28, 1949, attorney and future senator Jose W. Diokno married Carmen Icasiano at Ermita Church. Diokno was also baptized here on September 3, 1922, his godmother and second mother was Paz Wilson. By 1953, the reconstruction was completed and the image was returned to the new church.

On December 3, 2005, Manila Archbishop Cardinal Gaudencio B. Rosales elevated the status of this church to an archdiocesan shrine.

== Vicariate of Nuestra Señora de Guia ==
The church is under the jurisdiction of the Archdiocese of Manila under the vicariate forane of Nuestra Señora de Guia. Aside from the parish church, the vicariate covers the following churches:

- Manila Cathedral
- San Agustin Church, Intramuros
- San Vicente de Paul Parish, Ermita
- Malate Church
- Our Lady of the Assumption Parish, Malate
- Sto. Niño de Baseco Parish, Baseco, Port Area

== Gallery ==
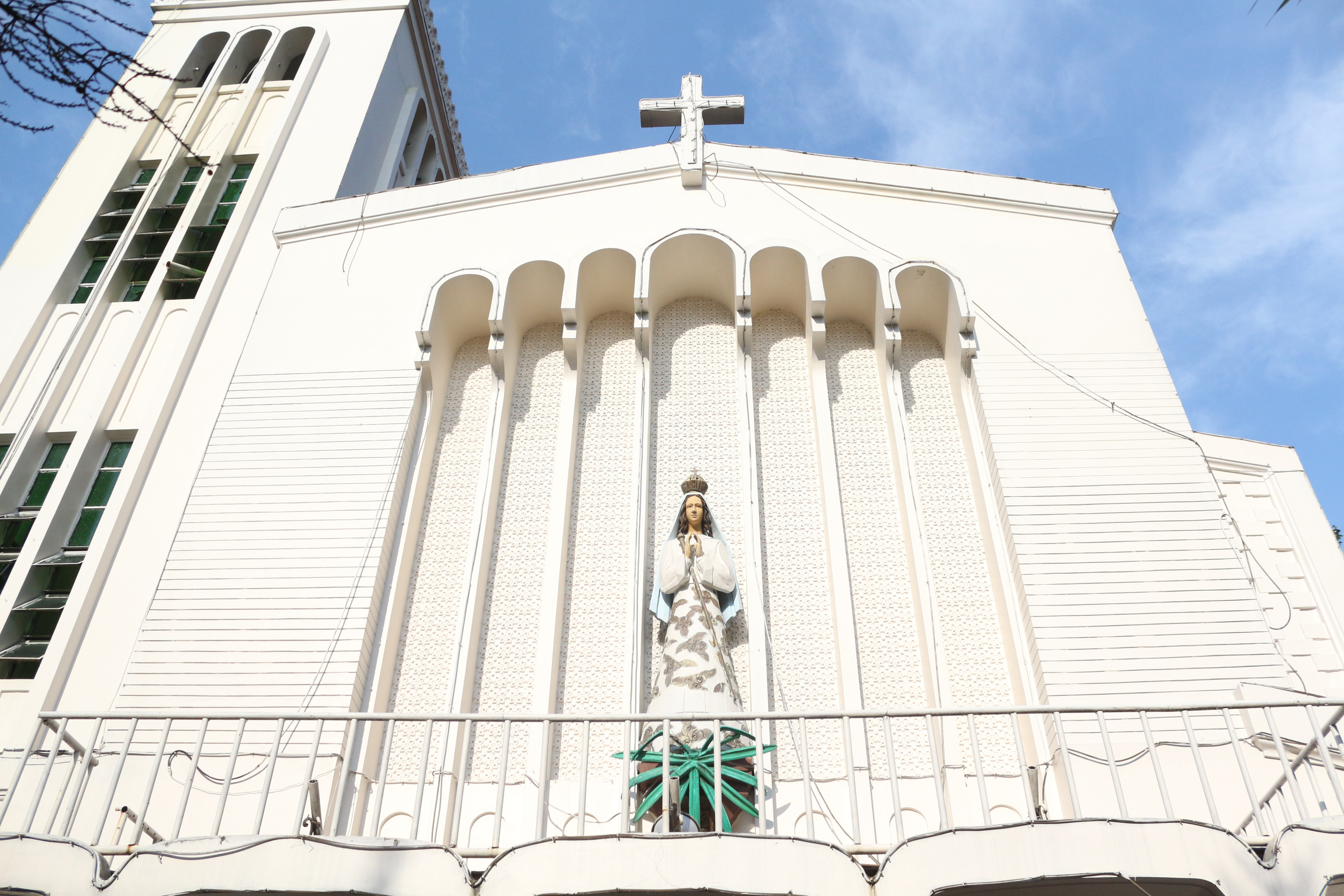
Old façade (2014)

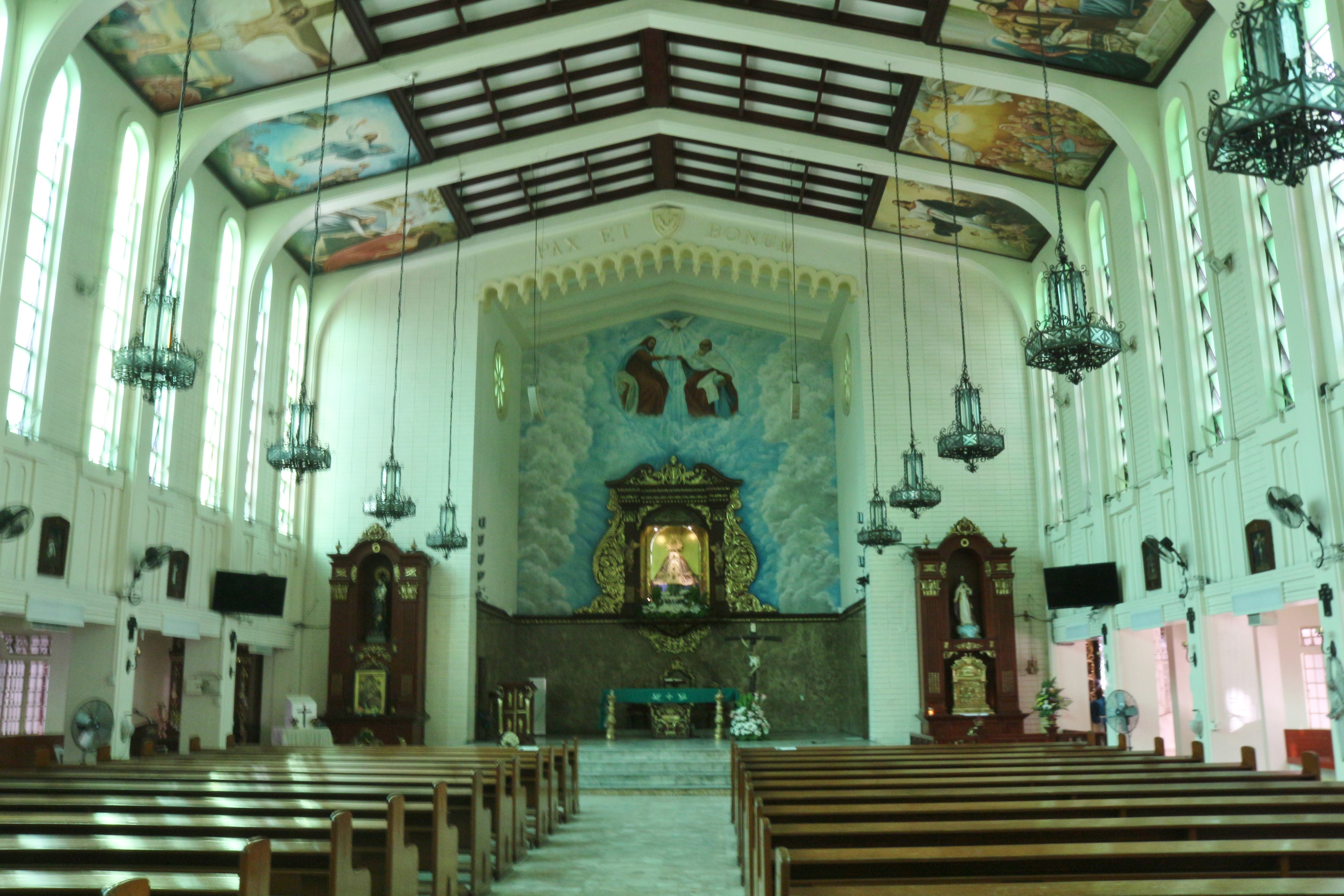
Church interior in 2014

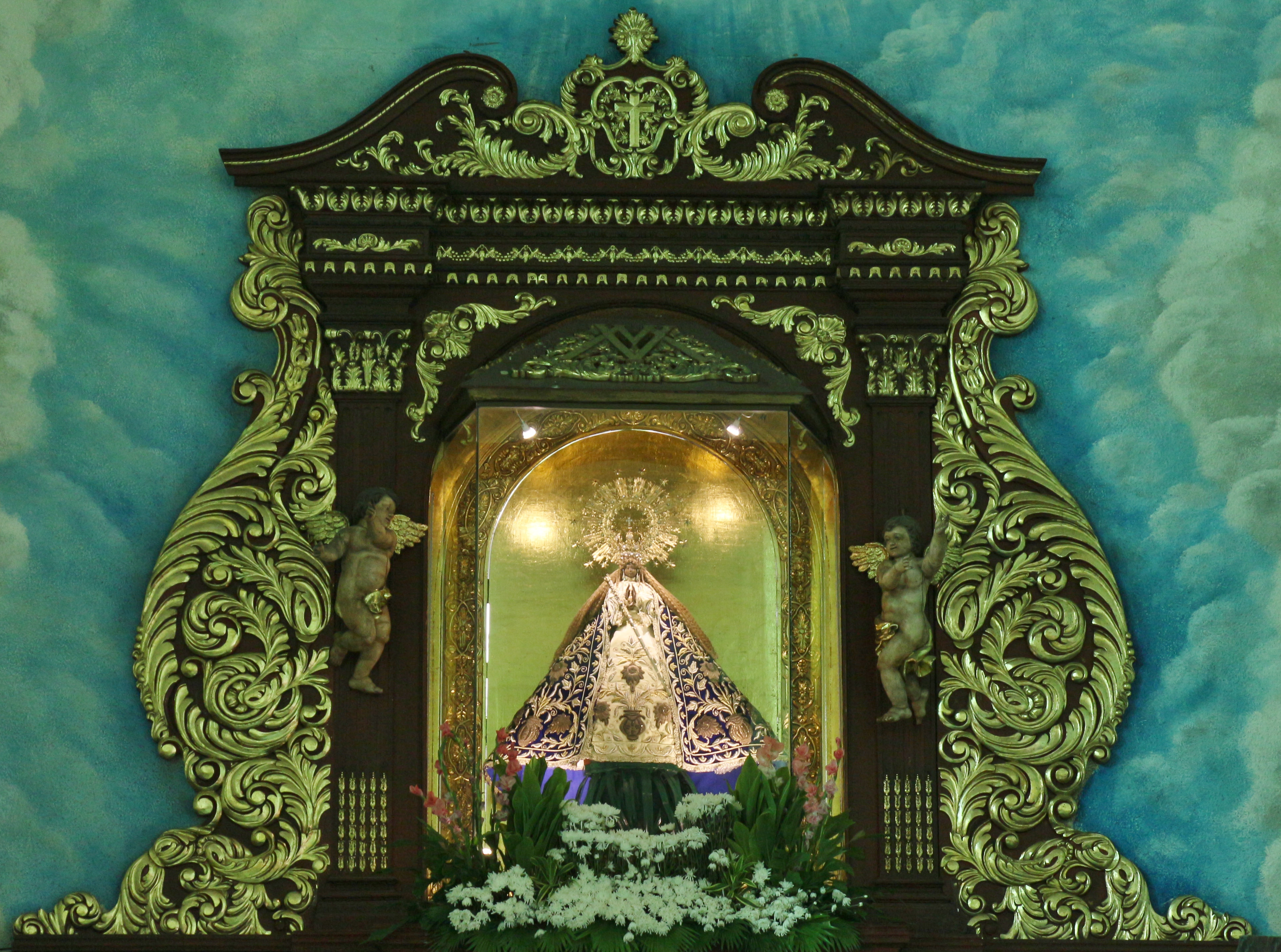
Nuestra Señora de Guia enshrined in the church altar

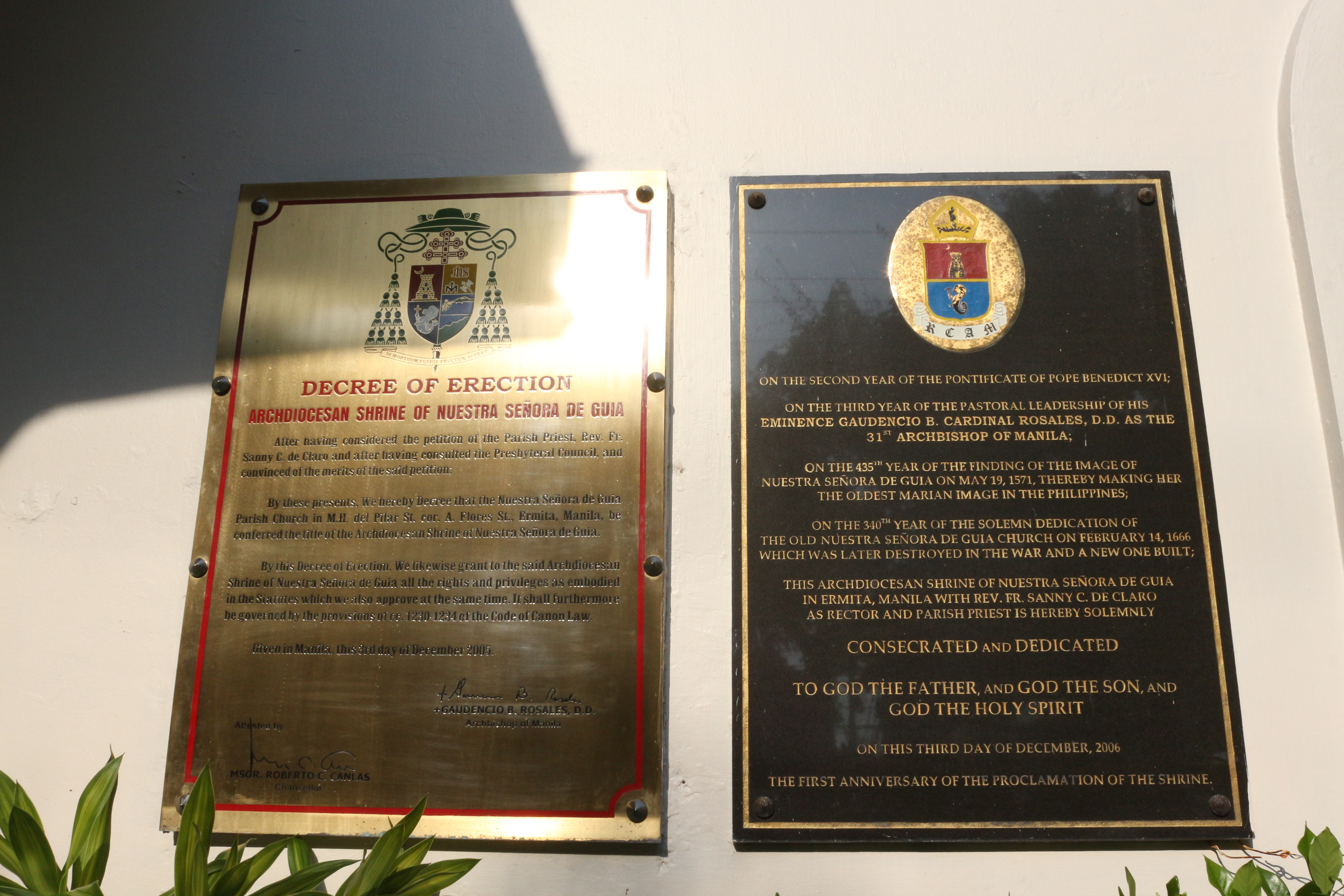
Archdiocesan Shrine markers

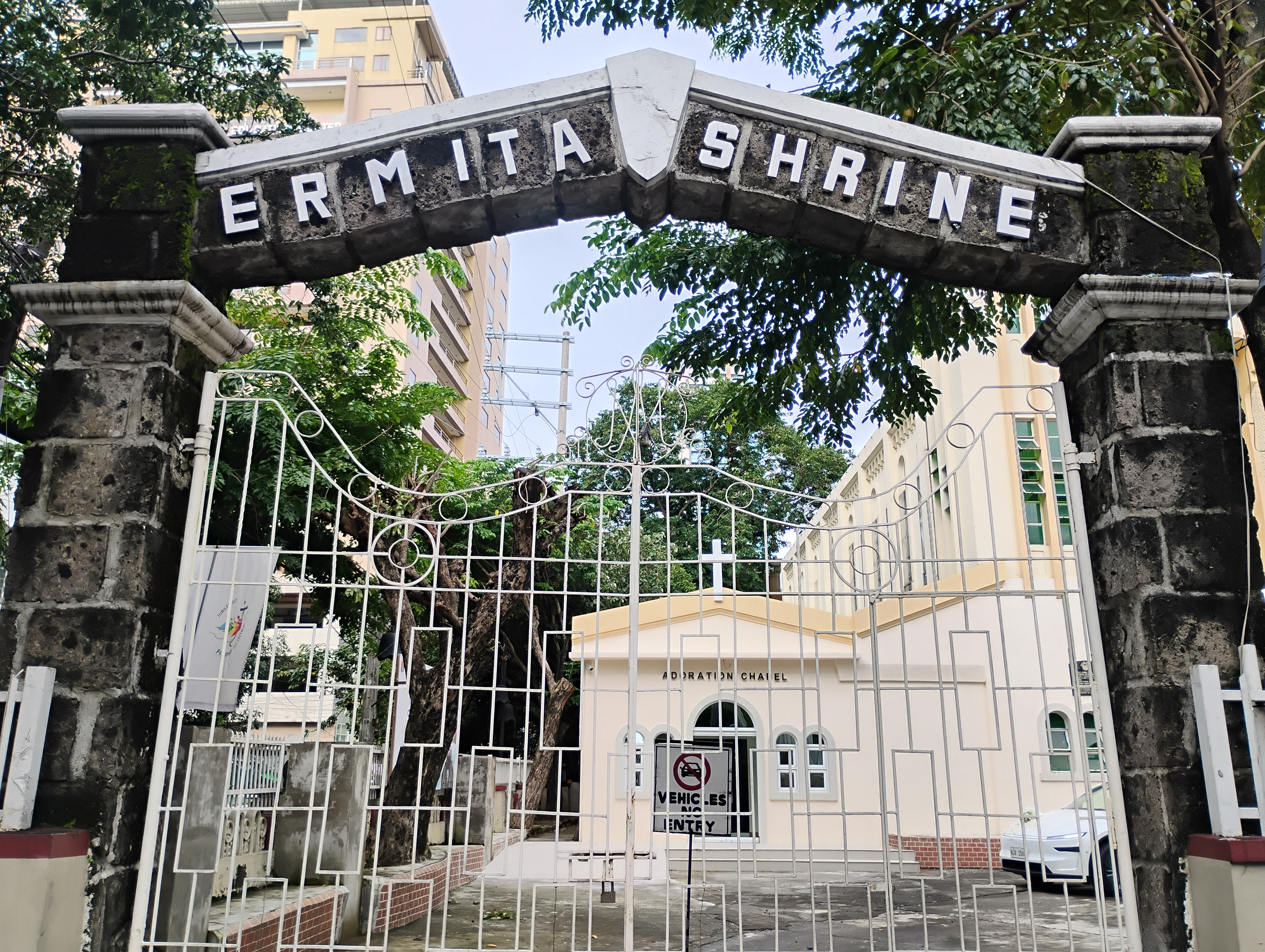
Ermita Shrine Welcome Arch
