= Patrick Peyton =

Irish Catholic priest (1909–1992)

Venerable Patrick Joseph Peyton CSC
- Born: January 9, 1909; Attymass, County Mayo, Ireland
- Died: June 3, 1992 (aged 83); San Pedro, California, United States

Patrick Joseph Peyton, CSC (January 8, 1909 – June 3, 1992), also known as "the rosary priest", was an Irish-born priest of the Congregation of Holy Cross who founded the Family Rosary Crusade. He popularized the phrases "The family that prays together stays together" and "A world at prayer is a world at peace."

Peyton staged massive rallies worldwide. He utilized mass communication, along with help from some Hollywood celebrities to promote his ministry. Peyton was a popular and charismatic figure in Latin America and the Philippines.

Peyton's cause for canonization was opened in 2001. Pope Francis declared him venerable in 2017.

== Biography ==
=== Early life ===
Patrick Peyton was born on January 9, 1909, in Attymass, County Mayo, in Ireland, to subsistence farmers John and Mary Gillard Peyton. Peyton was the sixth child in a family of five girls and four boys. The Peytons lived in a small cottage on a 14-acre (5.7 ha) stony farm near the foot of the Ox Mountains. They were a devout Catholic family that prayed the rosary every night.

At age five, Peyton was sent in 1914 to his mother's relatives in Bonniconlon, County Mayo, to study at the Bolend School. However, he remained close to his family and deeply religious. In 1917, at age 8, Peyton was living with his grandparents in Attymass and attending school there. While living with them, he spent some time picking potatoes for another farm family. Realizing that this family was not very religious, he convinced them to start praying the rosary. In 1923, then 15 years old, Peyton left this school after an incident with the school principal. He enrolled in another school in Currowerm, but dropped out a few months later to work on the family farm.

By his teens, he was considering a priestly vocation. He applied for a place in a Capuchin Order seminary, but never received a response. The Society of African Missionaries told him that his math grades from school disqualified him. Once John Peyton became too sick to work, his son put away his ambitions for the priesthood to concentrate on supporting the family. His sisters Nellie and Beatrice, who were already in America, sent money home to help the family. In 1927, these sisters convinced Peyton and his older brother Thomas to immigrate to the United States. Peyton decided that he could sell real estate once he was there. John Peyton gave the boys permission to go on the condition that they hold to their Catholic principles. On May 13, 1928, nineteen-year-old Peyton and Thomas set sail for New York City.

=== Immigration to United States ===
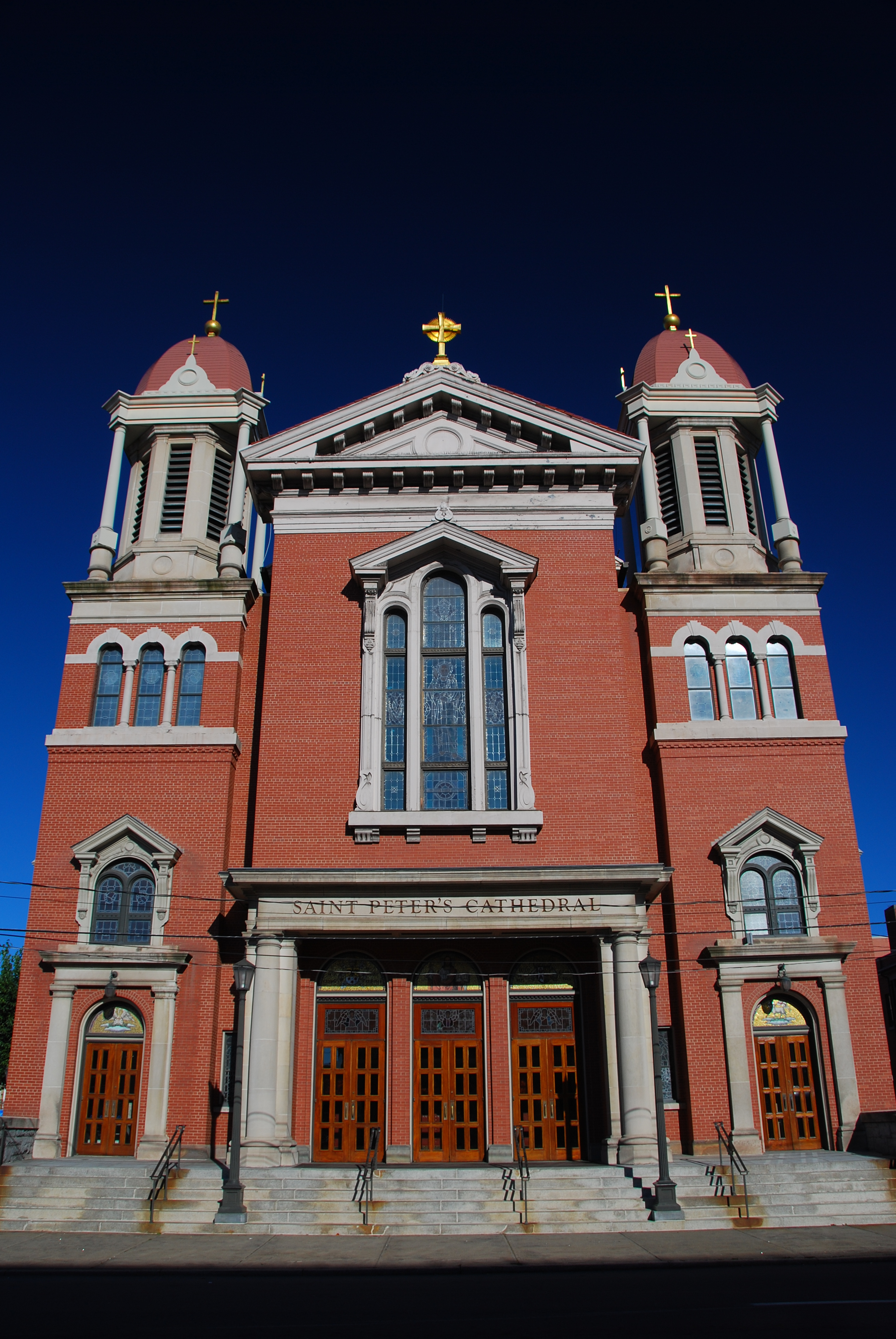
St. Peter's Cathedral, Scranton

The two brothers arrived in New York City after a 10-day trip, traveling by steerage. They took the train from New York to Scranton, Pennsylvania, to live with Beatrice and her family. Nellie had previously spoken to Paul Kelly of Saint Peter's Cathedral in Scranton, mentioning Peyton's interest in the priesthood. Kelly told her to bring him to the cathedral for a conversation as soon as he arrived. Peyton refused and started looking for a job. In June 1928, Kelly searched for and offered him a job as the cathedral sexton.

Peyton took the job as sexton with hesitation, but his daily presence at the cathedral motivated him again to become a priest. Kelly encouraged Peyton's vocation, but insisted that he complete his high school education before admission to the novitiate. With Thomas deciding to enter the priesthood also, the two brothers entered high school while working at the cathedral. In early 1929, the priest Pat Dolan of the Congregation of Holy Cross came to Scranton to recruit new seminarians for his order. Peyton and Thomas left Philadelphia to enter Holy Cross School in Notre Dame, Indiana, the minor seminary of the Holy Cross brothers. The brothers professed their temporary vows to the Holy Cross brothers in 1932.

=== Higher education and ordination ===
After completing their high school studies at Holy Cross, Peyton was admitted to the Moreau Seminary of the University of Notre Dame in 1932, where he pursued a Bachelor of Arts. Peyton later credited Cornelius Hagerty, a priest who was the professor of ethics, as being his spiritual advisor.

Peyton entered the School of Theology at the Catholic University of America in Washington, D.C. in 1937. However, in October 1938, he was diagnosed with tuberculosis. Peyton left Catholic University for Notre Dame, where he spent the next year in recovery. Throughout this period, Hagerty encouraged Peyton to seek the intercession of the Blessed Virgin Mary. Peyton later said that he felt cured in October 1838. His doctors said that the patches in his lungs had disappeared.

Peyton re-entered Catholic University to complete his theology studies and take his final vows. On June 15, 1941, Peyton and Thomas were ordained priests at the Basilica of the Sacred Heart at the University of Notre Dame as members of the Congregation of Holy Cross.

=== Family Rosary Crusade ===
==== Assignment to Albany ====
After his ordination in June 1941, the Holy Cross brothers assigned Peyton to Albany, New York, as the chaplain to the Holy Cross brothers who were on the faculty of the Vincentian Institute, a Catholic school in Albany, New York. After the American entry into World War II in December 1941, Peyton started thinking about ways to end violence in the world. Drawing on his family history of saying the rosary, plus what he believed was the intercession of the Virgin Mary when he had tuberculosis, he decided to start a movement for families to pray the rosary together.

Peyton recruited students and faculty at the Vincentian Institute to create a letter-writing campaign to bishops throughout the United States, asked for their help in a campaign to promote rosary prayer by families. In 1942, Peyton knelt at the Grotto of Our Lady of Lourdes at the Vincentian Institute and promised to establish ten million rosary homes.

==== First radio shows ====
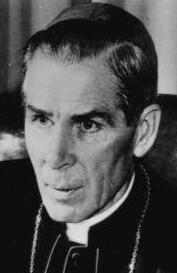
Bishop Fulton J. Sheen (1956)

A Catholic college in the Albany area donated a time slot on a local radio station to broadcast Peyton's first program on the family rosary. Each week, he would invite a different Catholic family to pray the rosary with him on air. The station management was initially skeptical of the concept, but the show proved to be very popular with its listeners.

Peyton got in contact with Fulton Sheen, a popular priest who had his own weekly radio show with the National Broadcasting Company (NBC). Sheen agreed to offer his audience a free rosary along with an instructional brochure on using it, both provided by Peyton. Sheen told Peyton to expect around 10,000 responses. Instead, the show received over 56,000 requests for the rosary and brochure in two weeks, from Catholics and non-Catholics.

Realizing that he needed the mass media to achieve his goal, Peyton traveled to New York City. He pitched his idea of a radio show to pray for peace to executives of the Mutual Broadcasting System, a national radio network. Mutual said it would run the show if Peyton could persuade a celebrity to appear on it. He then contacted the singer Bing Crosby, who agreed to do it. US President Harry S. Truman, a non-Catholic, endorsed the program.

Peyton's program aired on Mutual in May 1945, In addition to Crosby, the show also featured an appearance by Cardinal Francis Spellman of the Archdiocese of New York. Also praying on the broadcast were members of the Sullivan family of Iowa. Five brothers from that family had been sailors on the USS Juneau; they had died when their ship was sunk during the 1942 Naval Battle of Guadalcanal. The radio program became the most popular program in Mutual's history.

==== Family Theater radio show ====
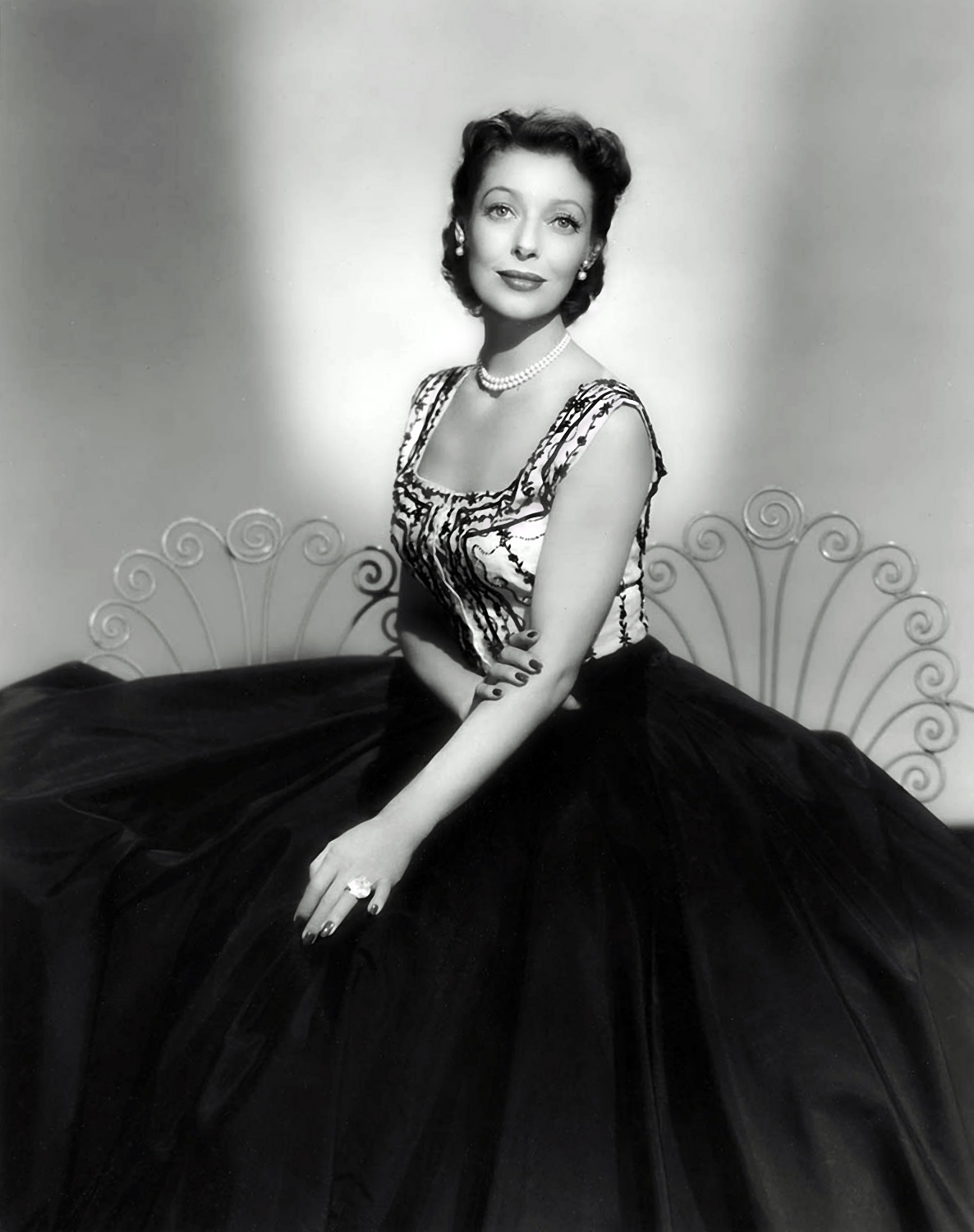
Loretta Young

Despite the success of the 1945 radio show in New York, Peyton was unable to interest any of the networks in New York in an ongoing program. He realized that he needed to make connections with big names in the entertainment industry in Los Angeles. However, the end of the war meant that most trains were fully of soldiers being transported home. However, Peyton was given a train ticket to California by a religious sister who had been planning to visit a relative there. After arriving in Los Angeles, he met with Archbishop John Joseph Cantwell of the Archdiocese of Los Angeles. Cantwell then asked his priests to arrange introductions for Peyton with any of their parishioners who were celebrities.

From Good Shepherd Parish in Beverly Hills, California, Peyton received support from the actresses Irene Dunn and Maureen O'Hara. The actress Loretta Young and her husband, producer Tom Lewis, were instrumental in lining up a studio commitment for Peyton's project. He now approached Mutual again for a weekly show.

Mutual agreed to provide the studio and airtime for Peyton's show. He was responsible for obtaining a celebrity each week and for paying all labor costs. Mutual also required that the words "Catholic", "Jewish" or "Protestant" not be mentioned during the show nor could anyone pray the rosary. However, Peyton could buy commercials in the program that promoted the family rosary. Peyton was not satisfied with the restrictions on the show, but Spellman advised him to take it anyway.

The Family Theater program premiered on February 13, 1947, with actor Jimmy Stewart as the narrator and Loretta Young and Don Ameche as its star attractions. The catchphrase of the program was “The Family That Prays Together Stays Together”. The show was a great success, being broadcast by 1952 on 460 stations of Mutual Broadcasting in the United States and abroad. Peyton in 1947 established Family Theater Productions to produce film, radio and later television programming.

==== Family Rosary rallies ====
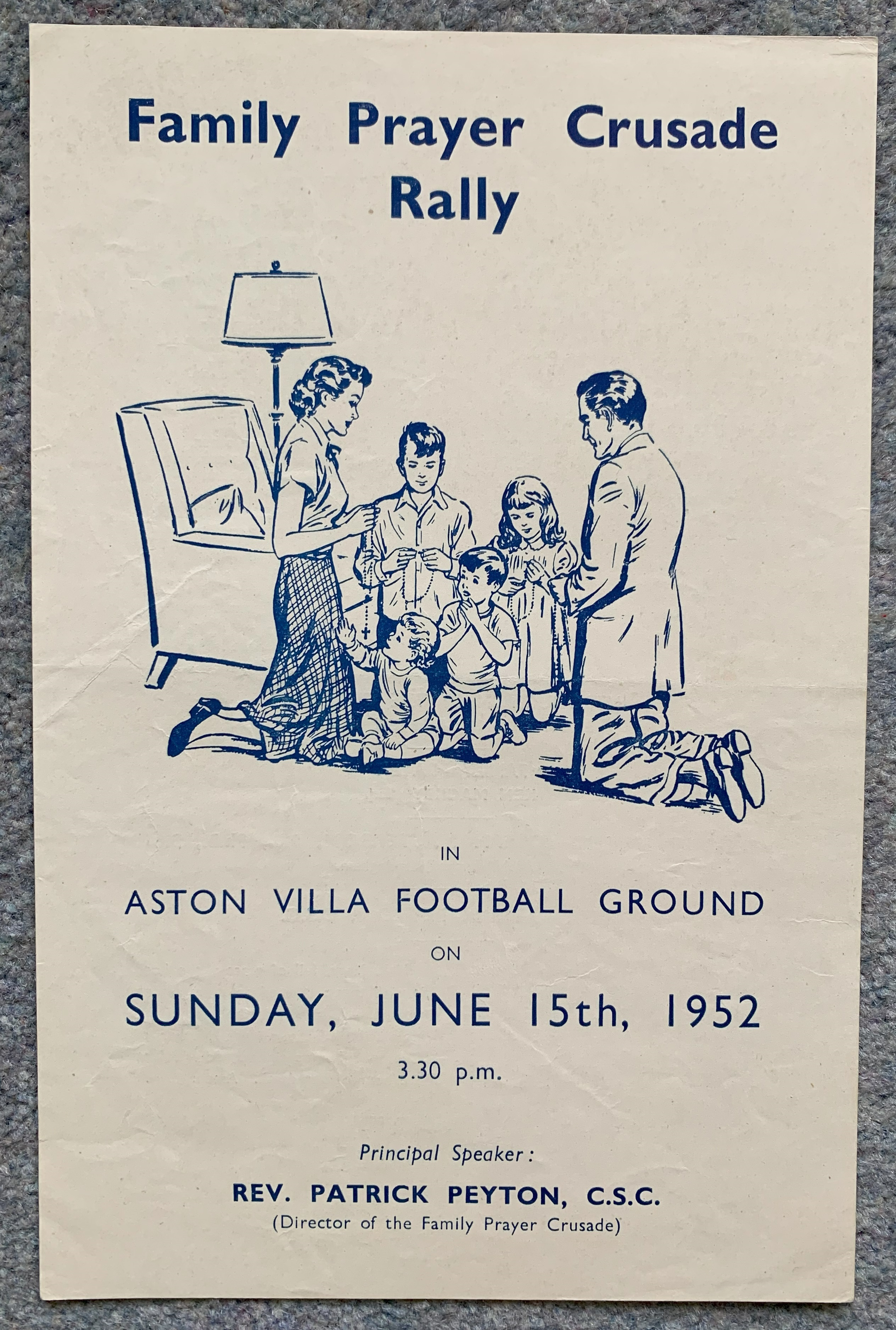
Pamphlet for Family Rosary Crusade rally in Birmingham, England

The end of World War II in 1945 heralded the beginning of the Cold War rivalry between the communist regime of the Soviet Union and the United States. As it had for decades, the Catholic church viewed communism as its greatest enemy. According to historian Hugh Wilford, made this statement in a 1946 radio broadcast, 'The rosary is the offensive weapon that will destroy Communism—the great evil that seeks to destroy the faith.'"

In 1948, Bishop John Thomas Kidd of the Diocese of London in Ontario invited Peyton to hold a rally there. Several thousand lay volunteers were enlisted to promote the event and handle its logistics. The rally was held at Labatt Memorial Park, a baseball stadium in London, Ontario. Over 80,000 people attended the rally.

The success of the London event prompted Peyton embark on three-day rallies in different cities and countries. After obtaining the support of the local bishop, priests would promote the event to their parishioners. He conducted his first American rosary crusade on the grounds of St. Ann's Monastery (the Basilica of the National Shrine of St. Ann) in Scranton in 1949. Over the coming 15 years, Peyton staged massive rallies at sites in Europe, North America, South America, Asia and Oceania.

==== Television and film ====
Family Theater Productions in March 1951 broadcast its first television production, The Triumphant Hour. It related the Christ story from his crucifixion to his resurrection. A 1953 production, Dawn of America, was about Christopher Columbus, with emphasis on his religious faith sustaining him through adversity.

Peyton wanted to create television episodes telling on the 15 Mysteries of the Rosary, These were 15 events in the life of Christ. The project was starting in 1956 and completed in 1958. The episodes were filmed in Spain and ultimately edited into three motion pictures. The Life of Christ Series, as it was called, premiered in Brussels, Belgium, in May 1958 at the Vatican pavilion of Expo 58.

==== CIA funding ====
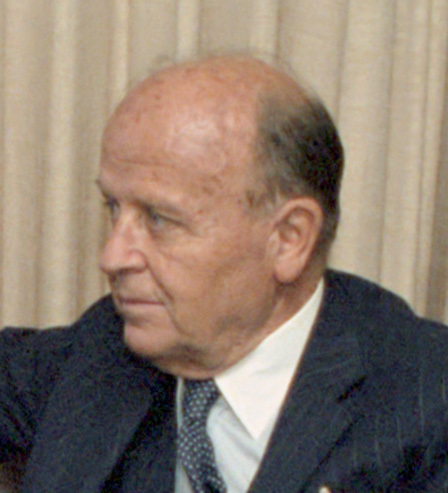
J. Peter Grace (1982)

During the 1950s, one of Peyton's many benefactors and friends was J. Peter Grace, the CEO of W. R. Grace & Co. Peyton had met Grace in 1946 on a trans-Atlantic voyage. During this period of the Cold War, the Eisenhower Administration was very concerned about the Soviet Union setting up communist regimes in South America. Grace believed that Peyton's rallies could help counter that influence in the region.

As Peyton was starting a Family Rosary Crusade in South America, Grace met with Allen W. Dulles, director of the Central Intelligence Agency (CIA). Grace proposed that the CIA help Peyton in funding rallies there. After an approval by Vice President Richard Nixon, the CIA sent $20,000 to Peyton and asked him to go to Chile instead of his planned stop in Bolivia. Glad to get the money, Peyton complied. Over the next seven years, Peyton received $1 million from the CIA.

However, the Holy Cross brothers who knew about Peyton's CIA funding were uneasy with the idea of an intelligence agency funding Catholic activities. In October 1964, Theodore Hesburgh, the former president of the University of Notre Dame and a Holy Cross brother, reported the situation to Germaine Lalande, superior general of the Holy Cross brothers, saying,

“I cannot alter my opinion that this situation is extremely dangerous . . . I believe that all of the good would be destroyed, as well as many other innocent works, if the facts of the matter ever came to light.”

Lalande summoned Peyton to meet with him in Rome. Peyton said that losing the CIA funding would bankrupt the Family Rosary Crusades. Lalande warned him about how this situation could reflect on the Catholic Church, but did not stop him. Soon after the meeting, word was passed to Pope Paul VI about the CIA funding. In 1965, the pope ordered Peyton to immediately stop accepting money from the CIA.

Suffering from congestive heart failure, Peyton's health began to fail in the 1990s. He was hospitalized for it three times. Peyton finally moved into the Jeanne Jugan Residence in San Pedro, California, operated by the Little Sisters of the Poor.

=== Death ===
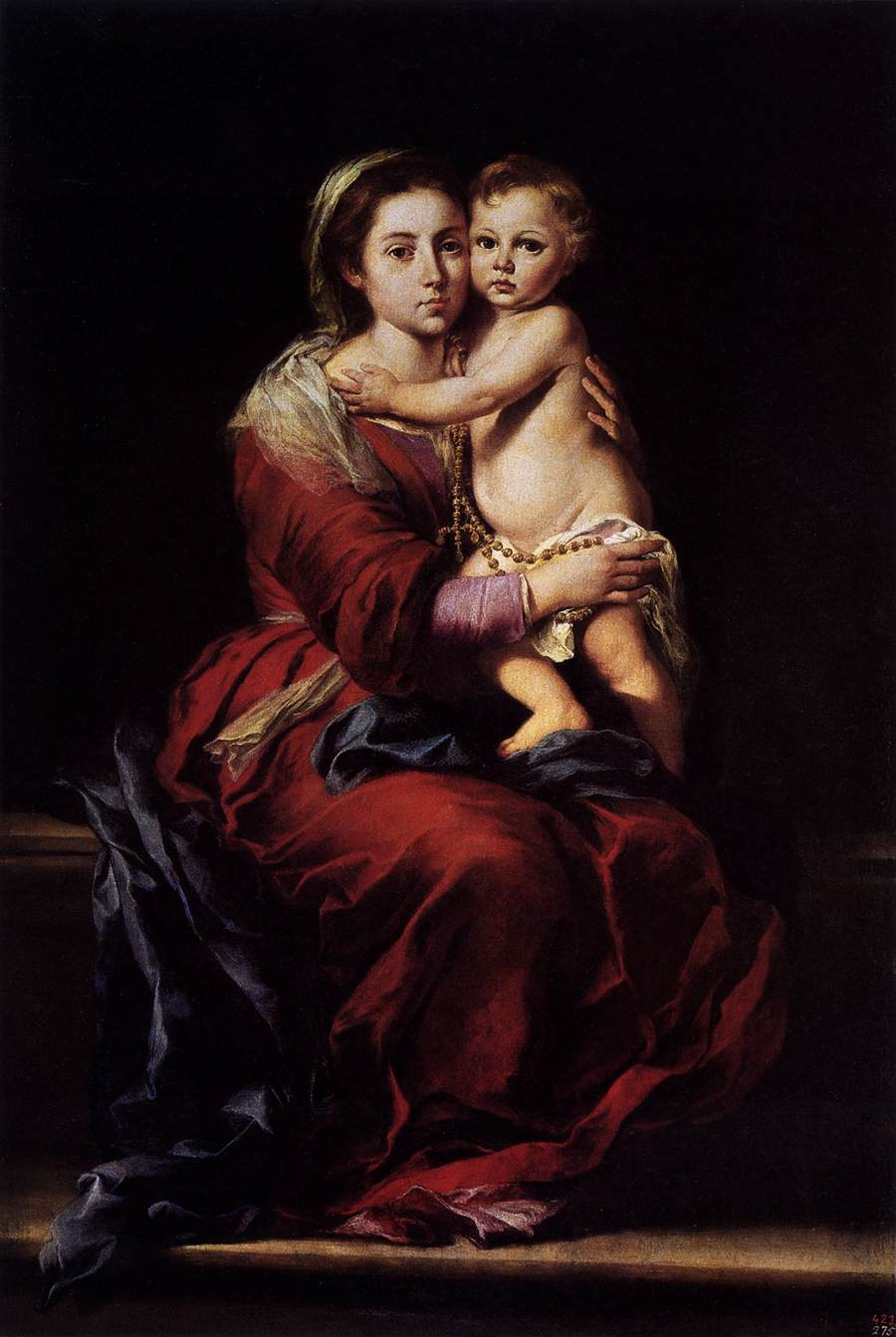
The Our Lady of the Rosary painting by Bartolomé Esteban Murillo appeared in the background on Family Rosary television shows

Peyton died of kidney failure on June 3, 1992, at age 83 at the Jeanne Jugan Residence. He was holding a rosary at that time. He was buried on June 8 at the Holy Cross Cemetery on the grounds of Stonehill College in Easton, Massachusetts.

== Legacy ==
Peyton's work continues today in his original ministries – Family Rosary, Family Theater, and Family Rosary International – and the Father Patrick Peyton Family Institute.

In March 2019, the RTÉ One television channel in Ireland released Guns & Rosaries, a documentary about Peyton and the 1964 coup d'état in Brazil. The program was narrated by the actor Martin Sheen.

In October 2020, Family Theater Productions released a biographical film about Peyton, entitled Pray: The Story of Patrick Peyton.

The following are named after Peyton:

- Patrick Peyton Athletic Complex, Gloucester Catholic High School in Sewell, New Jersey
- Father Peyton Centre, Attymass, Ballina, Co. Mayo in Ireland
- Father Peyton Family Institute in Bengaluru, India
- Father Peyton Family Institute, Lima, Peru
- Peyton Institute for Domestic Church Life in North Easton.

== Celebrities who appeared on Peyton's radio and TV shows ==
Lucille Ball	Raymond Burr	Bing Crosby	Jimmy Stewart
Rosalind Russell	Danny Thomas	Ann Blyth	Loretta Young
Don Ameche	Jack Benny	Kirk Douglas	Natalie Wood
Bob Hope	Maureen O'Hara	Gregory Peck	Ronald Reagan
James Dean	Helen Hayes	Robert Young	Frank Sinatra
Bob Newhart	Grace Kelly	Pat O’Brien	Jane Wyatt
Roddy McDowell			

== Major rallies led by Peyton ==
Year	Location	Attendance	Notes
1948	Labatt Memorial Park, London Ontario	80,000	Peyton's first rally
1952	Polo Grounds, New York City	76,000	Attended by Cardinal Francis Spellman
1952	Hyde Park, London, England	100,000	
1953	Melbourne, Australia	150,000	
1954	Belfast, Northern Ireland	100,000	
1954	Republic of Ireland	400,000	Over several rallies
1955	Bombay (now Mumbai), India	200,000	
1959	Cebu, Philippines	1 million	
1959	Luneta Park, Manila, Philippines	1.5 million	
1961	Golden Gate Park, San Francisco, California	550,000	
1962	Bogotá, Colombia	1 million	
1962	Rio de Janeiro, Brazil	1.5 million	
1965	São Paulo, Brazil	2 million	

== Veneration ==
In June 2001, Bishop Seán Patrick O'Malley of the Diocese of Fall River officially opened Peyton's cause for canonization. He was named Servant of God at that time. Over 150 people were interviewed worldwide to prepare the positio, or documents, regarding Peyton's holiness. The positio was submitted to the Congregation for the Causes of Saints at the Vatican in 2015 for assessment.

A panel of Vatican theologians approved Peyton's cause on June 1, 2017. Pope Francis named him as venerable on December 18, 2017.

== Sources ==
- Peyton, CSC, Patrick (1996) [1967], All For Her: An Autobiography of Father Patrick Peyton, CSC, Family Theater Publications, Hollywood California, ASIN B0006CCAGY.
- Shiel, Tom (27 April 2009), Cardinal urges Christians to twitter, Irish Times.
- Matilla, Dexter R. (31 March 2009), 'Rosary priest' to be honored with sculpture, Philippines Daily Inquirer, archived from the original on 30 April 2009.
- Bourke, Toni (17 April 2009), Fr Peyton remembered at 100th anniversary celebrations, Mayo Advertiser.
- Schworm, Peter (8 June 2008), "Dozens in Easton pray for canonization of the 'Rosary Priest'", Boston Globe.
- Gribble, Richard (22 June 2003), Anti-communism, Patrick Peyton, CSC and the C.I.A.(Congregation of Holy Cross), Journal of Church and State/J.M. Dawsons Studies on Church and State.
- "Fifty Golden Years of the Family Rosary Crusade in the Philippines (1951-2001)" written by Father James B. Reuter, SJ; Gennie Q. Jota; Dean M. Bernardo, edited by Stella J. Villegas 2001 Family Rosary Crusade Foundation, Inc. © 2001
- Wilford, Hugh. The Mighty Wurlitzer: How the CIA Played America. Cambridge and London: Harvard University Press, 2008.
