= Family Rosary Crusade =

Roman Catholic religious movement

- The Family That Prays Together Stays Together
- Classification: Catholic Marian Family Prayer Movement
- Orientation: Marian prayers
- Moderator: Rev. Fr. Wilfred Raymond, C.S.C.
- Associations: Family Theater/Family Rosary International/Father Peyton Institute
- Region: United States, Bangladesh, Brazil, Chile, Haiti, India, Ireland, Kenya, Mexico, Peru, Philippines, Sierra Leone, Spain, Ghana, Tanzania, Uganda, Uruguay
- Founder: Venerable Patrick Peyton, C.S.C.
- Origin: January 25, 1947; Albany, New York
- Branched from: Holy Cross Family Ministries
- Congregations: Congregation of Holy Cross
- Official website: http://www.hcfm.org/

Family Rosary Crusade is a worldwide campaign that eventually became a Catholic movement, which was founded by Patrick Peyton, an Irish-American priest. The endeavor came to be a personal mission to undertake the promotion of the praying of the Rosary by families as a means to unite them.

The campaign's objective is to promote the praying of the Rosary by families. Peyton believed that together as a family, in unison praying the Rosary, the family is united before Christ and drawn closer to God.

== History ==
Patrick Peyton was born to an Irish Catholic family, at a time of hardships in the early years of the 20th century. His family were staunchly Catholic farmers, who prayed the Rosary together as a regular practice.

Peyton entered Moreau Seminary at the University of Notre Dame in Indiana. In 1941 he learned that he had tuberculosis. He immersed himself in meditation while praying the Rosary. A few months later, doctors discovered that the tuberculosis had disappeared. Peyton attributed his cure to the intercession of the Blessed Virgin Mary.

== Lifelong work ==
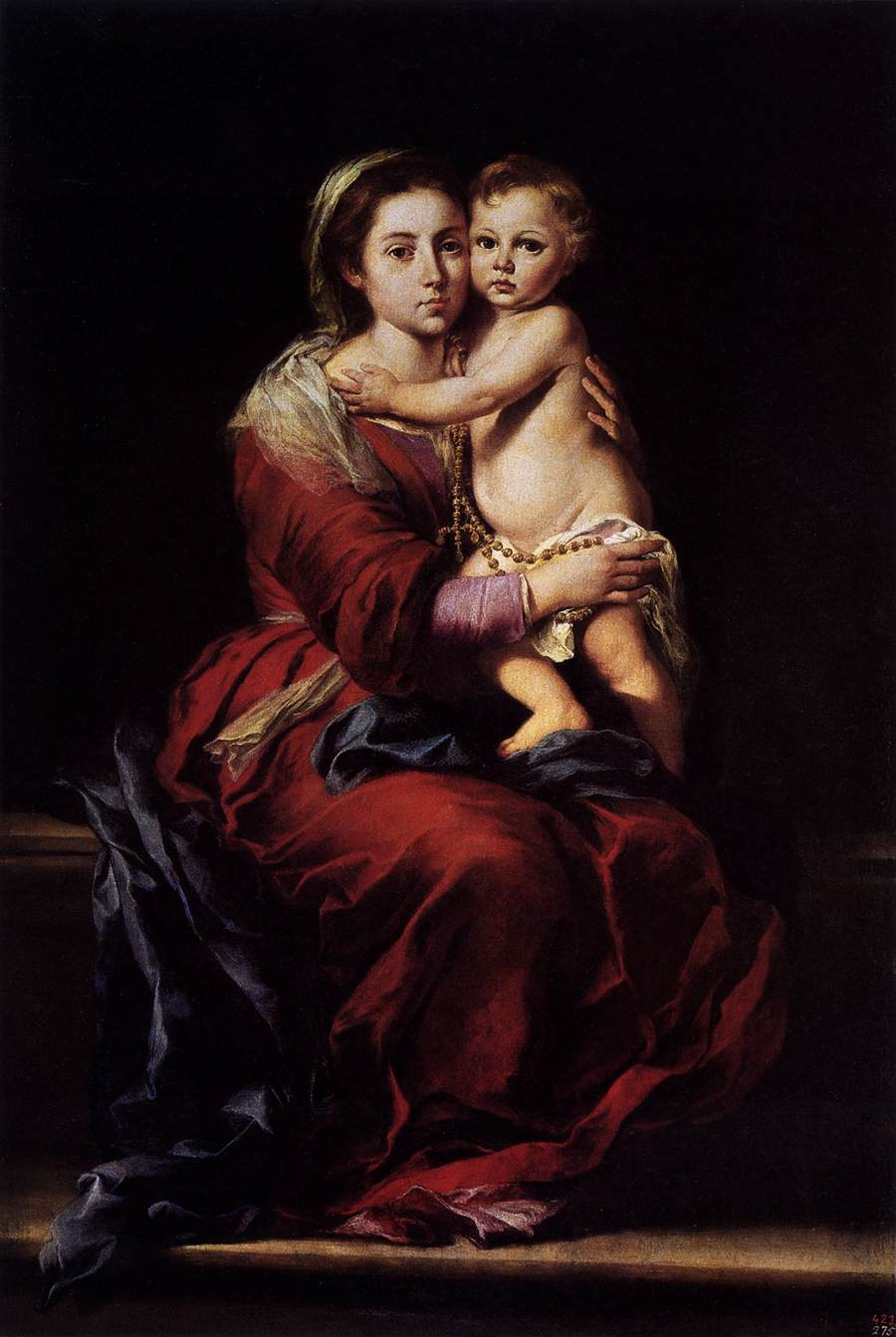
Our Lady of the Rosary, Murillo

Upon receiving his first assignment as a newly ordained priest in 1941, Father Peyton was assigned as a chaplain for a school managed by the Congregation of Holy Cross in Albany, New York. As a school chaplain in New York, Father Peyton lived a modest life and in his bedroom cell was a small bed, a study table and a painting of the Madonna and Child by Spanish painter Bartolomé Esteban Murillo. Peyton was drawn to the painting, which would serve as the main image of the Virgin Mary for the entirety of his Family Rosary Crusade efforts. The Murillo painting was first used as the cover for a pamphlet called "The Story of the Rosary".

Father Peyton discovered his mission in 1942 while reading about the Battle of Lepanto in 1571. Soldiers of Lepanto, with no hope of winning the war against the Moors, knelt and prayed the Rosary before a perceived losing battle. The Moors were defeated and pushed back. This incident, attributed to the intercession of the Blessed Mother, would serve as the preliminary foundations of establishing the crusade of prayer.

Peyton began writing to bishops, priests and Catholic lay organizations about the importance of families praying the Rosary. With the help of the Holy Cross Sisters in Albany and a friend, Father Francis Woods, Peyton began his appeals to promote the praying of the Rosary for all families.

== Evangelization through mass media ==
=== Radio ===
In October 1943, in order to reach a wider audience, Peyton arranged for fifteen minutes of air time for families to pray the Rosary on a local radio station in Albany, WABY. In 1945, the Mutual Broadcasting System, the largest radio network in the United States at that time, made available a half-hour to broadcast the Rosary. This was dubbed by Father Peyton as "the opportunity of a lifetime". Mutual's owner Ed Kobak set certain requirements in order for Father Peyton to make his broadcast:

- Invite the most famous, loved and revered family to pray the Rosary;
- Ask the most famous Hollywood stars to join them;
- Have the most influential people in the US Church speak; and
- Choose the most fitting day to have the majority of Americans listening eagerly to a religious broadcast.

On May 13, 1945, Mother's Day, Peyton's program debuted on nationwide radio on Mutual Broadcasting System from its studios in Broadway. The radio broadcast featured the Sullivan family of Iowa who had lost five sons in the Second World War to lead the praying of the Rosary, followed by a live endorsement from crooner Bing Crosby, patched from Mutual's Los Angeles radio station.

Peyton promoted his mission by sending letters and distributing free Rosary beads and prayer pamphlets. He continued to promote the mission using radio but network executives at Mutual wanted to air programs of Father Peyton with more than just the praying of the Rosary. The example set by Bing Crosby could be repeated with other Hollywood stars pitching the call for families praying the Rosary. Father Peyton journeyed to Los Angeles to recruit stars to volunteer to help promote his cause. In his first trip to California, actress Jane Wyatt would serve as his contact for other celebrities; they become lifelong friends.

=== Family Theater ===
With the help of Hollywood personalities, Peyton began to produce from Hollywood, family values-oriented radio dramas for Mutual under the banner of "Family Theater of the Air". The first broadcast was made on February 13, 1947, with guest artists Loretta Young, James Stewart (who was not a Catholic) and Don Ameche.

Others who also lent their talents were: Pat O'Brien, Grace Kelly, James Cagney, Bob Hope, Irene Dunne, Gregory Peck, Lucille Ball, Henry Fonda, Rosalind Russell, Jack Benny, Raymond Burr, Barbara Stanwyck, Margaret O'Brien, Helen Hayes, Natalie Wood, Maureen O'Hara, Jane Wyatt, Ronald Reagan, William Shatner, James Dean and Shirley Temple.

The Family Theater radio programs continued to air until 1969. The program gave rise to the establishment of Family Theater Productions, which opened offices in Hollywood with the mission of developing Christian family values film, radio, television programs and billboards.

=== Outdoor advertising ===
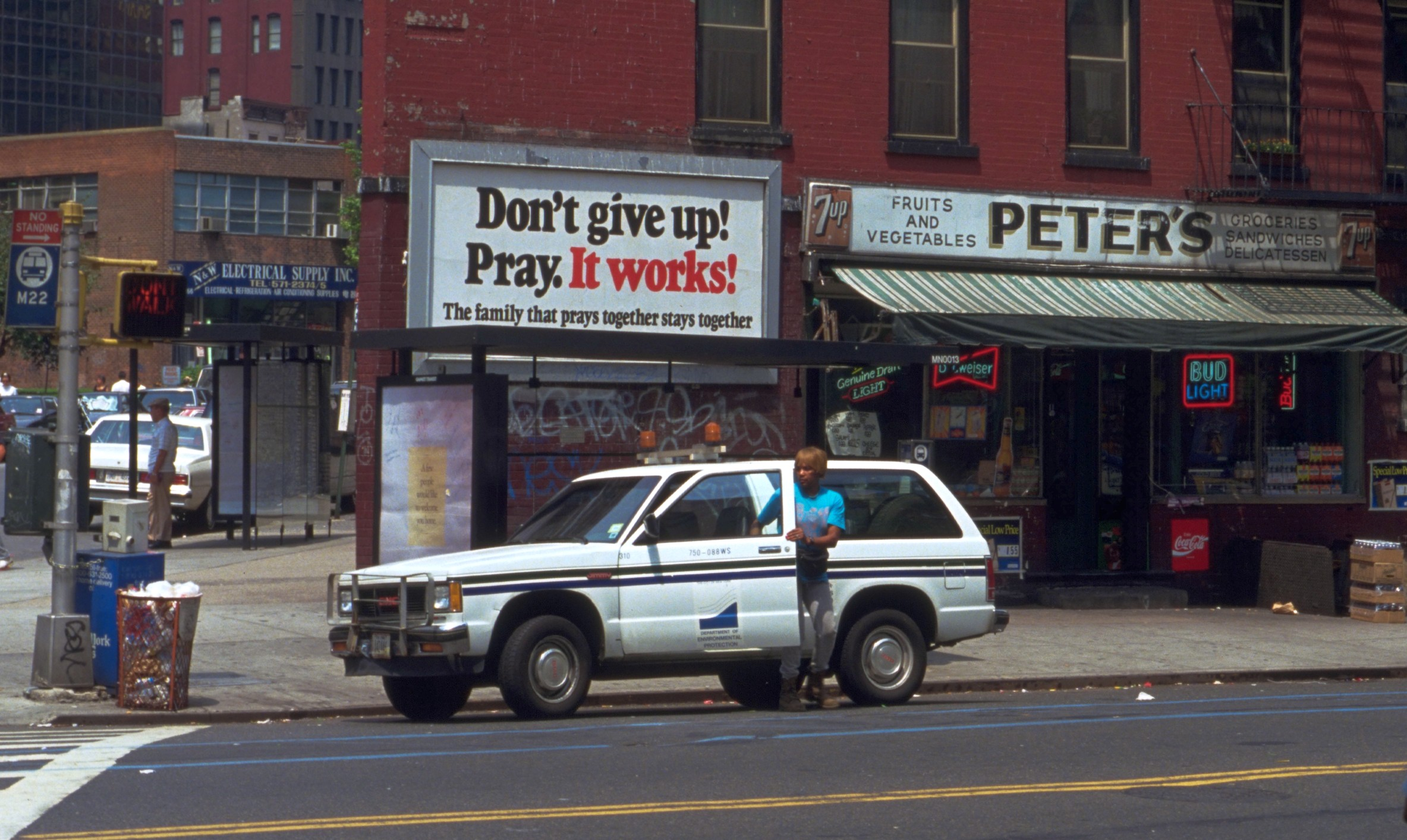
Billboard in 1991 in Manhattan, NY. The billboard reads: "Don't give up! Pray! It works! The family that prays together stays together".

A young ad executive and copywriter, Al Scalpone, donated his services to Family Theater in 1947 and wrote the now famous slogan, "The Family That Prays Together Stays Together" as well as "A World at Prayer is a World at Peace" for the radio series. They became the mottos for Father Peyton and his organization. Scalpone, who eventually became a vice president for CBS-TV, volunteered with Family Theater Productions for 40 years.

In 1947, a Los Angeles outdoor advertising company representative was taken by the slogan, "The Family That Prays Together Stays Together", he heard on the Family Theater radio series. The company offered to put the slogan on vacant billboards as a public service. The idea caught on with other advertising companies. Over the years messages included "Troubled? Try Prayer!", "Don't Give Up! Pray. It Works!", "God Makes House Calls", and "God Listens" each one followed by "The Family That Prays Together Stays Together".

These messages have appeared on more than 100,000 billboards throughout the country, courtesy of outdoor advertising associations and companies, and have been seen more than 400 million times, according to outdoor advertising associations' estimates. The campaign continues today with three new, contemporary posters designed in 2001, which have received a record number of orders from billboard companies.

== Rosary rallies ==
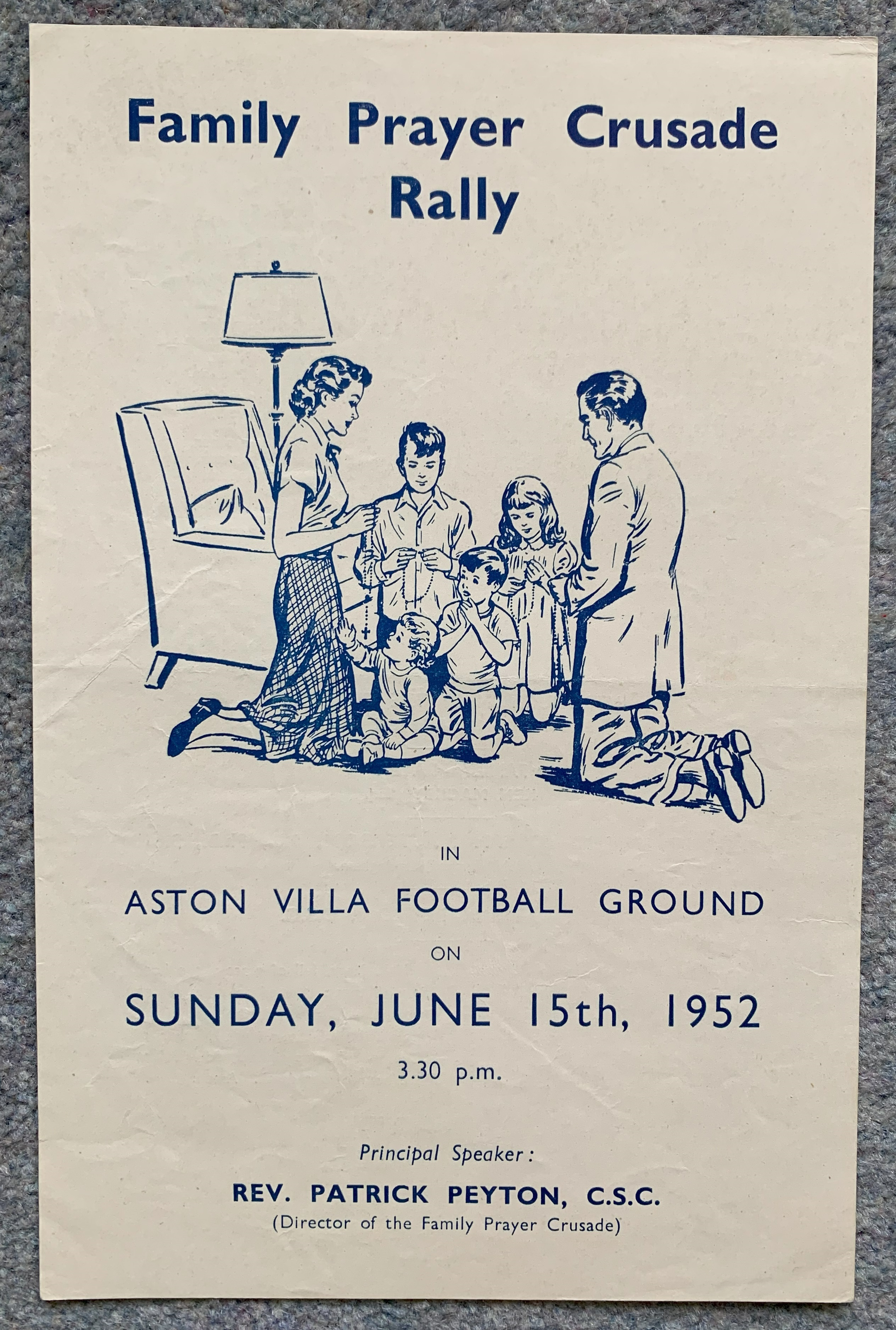
A flyer advertising a Family Prayer Crusade Rally to be held at Aston Villa football ground on June 15, 1952.

In 1947, the Diocese of London, Ontario, pioneered the diocesan crusades. The Diocesan Family Rosary Crusade started in Canada with the gathering of pledges from families to commit to the daily prayer of the Rosary as a family unit. The first large-scale Rosary rally was in Saskatchewan, Canada, at the Shrine of Our Lady of Mount Carmel, then under the authority of the Benedictines of St. Peter's Abbey, and with the participation of the Bishops of Saskatchewan, where 12,000 attended the rally on September 26, 1948.

In Manila in the Philippines, a million people came together to pray the Rosary. There were also large rallies in Birmingham, Bogotá, Bombay, Johannesburg, Madrid, New York City, San Francisco and Nairobi. Starting in 1959, Peyton's activities in Latin America were subsidized in part by the CIA, which saw them as an effective counter to communism. The funding continued until the Vatican was made aware of it and directed Peyton to stop accepting the money.

In 1987, Pope John Paul II said, "May the Rosary once more become the accustomed prayer of ... the Christian family." Though there are no Rosary rallies on the scale that Father Peyton had during his lifetime, groups all over the world conduct smaller rosary rallies.

== Holy Cross Family Ministries ==
After Father Peyton died in 1992, the Congregation of Holy Cross re-organized all component units founded by the Family Rosary Crusade under an umbrella ministry, Holy Cross Family Ministries, which remains committed to the original cause of Father Peyton, to promote and support the spiritual well-being of the family.

- Family Rosary and Family Rosary International encourage family prayer, especially the Rosary.
- Family Theater Productions directs its efforts to the evangelization of culture using mass media to entertain, inspire and educate families.
- The Father Peyton Family Institute focuses on research and education in family life ministry and the relationship of spirituality to family.

Holy Cross Family Ministries is based in North Easton, Massachusetts.

== Sources ==
- Peyton, CSC, Patrick (1996) [1967], All For Her: An Autobiography of Father Patrick Peyton, CSC, Family Theater Publications, Hollywood California, ASIN B0006CCAGY.
- Shiel, Tom (April 27, 2009), Cardinal urges Christians to twitter, Irish Times.
- Matilla, Dexter R. (March 31, 2009), 'Rosary priest' to be honored with sculpture, Philippines Daily Inquirer, archived from the original on April 30, 2009.
- Bourke, Toni (April 17, 2009), Fr Peyton remembered at 100th anniversary celebrations, Mayo Advertiser.
- Schworm, Peter (June 8, 2008), Dozens in Easton pray for canonization of the 'Rosary Priest', Boston Globe.
- Gribble, Richard (June 22, 2003), Anti-communism, Patrick Peyton, CSC and the C.I.A.(Congregation of Holy Cross), Journal of Church and State/J.M. Dawsons Studies on Church and State.
- "Fifty Golden Years of the Family Rosary Crusade in the Philippines (1951–2001)" written by Father James B. Reuter, SJ; Gennie Q. Jota; Dean M. Bernardo, edited by Stella J. Villegas 2001 Family Rosary Crusade Foundation, Inc. © 2001
